= Silverio =

Silverio or Silvério is a surname or given name. Notable people with the name include:

Given name:

- Silvério Paulo de Albuquerque, O.F.M. (1917–2013), Brazilian bishop of the Roman Catholic Church
- Silverio Pinto Baptista (born 1969), Provedor (Ombudsman) for Human Rights and Justice of Timor-Leste
- Silverio Blasi (1921–1995), Italian TV and stage director, actor and screenwriter
- Silverio Cavazos (1968–2010), Mexican politician, the Governor of Colima 2005–2009
- Silverio Franconetti (1831–1889), singer, leading figure of The Golden Age in flamenco history
- Silvério Garcia (born 1994), East Timorese football player
- Silverio Izaguirre (1898–1935), Spanish Olympic football player
- Silverio García Lara, researcher & professor in the Monterrey Institute of Technology and Higher Studies
- João Pedro Silverio Lourenço (born 2005), Brazilian footballer
- Silverio López Magallanes (born 1957), Mexican politician
- Jaime Silvério Marques (1915–1986), Portuguese brigadier-general and colonial administrator
- Silvino Silvério Marques (1918–2013), Portuguese colonial administrator, general of the Portuguese Army
- Silvério José Néri (1858–1934), Brazilian soldier and politician, governor and senator
- Silverio Ortiz (born 1982), Mexican professional boxer
- Silverio Pérez (born 1948), Puerto Rican musician, writer, comedian, entrepreneur, broadcasting host
- Silverio Pérez (bullfighter) (1915–2006), Mexican matador
- Silverio Petrucci (died 1560), Roman Catholic Bishop of Muro Lucano
- Joaquim Silvério dos Reis (1756–1819), conspirator who betrayed the Inconfidência Mineira
- Dejair Igor Silverio Ribeiro (born 1994), Brazilian footballer
- Luiz Flávio Silverio Silva (born 2000), known as Flávio, Brazilian footballer
- Silvério Silva (born 1995), known as Silvério, Portuguese footballer
- João Silvério Trevisan (born 1944), Brazilian author, playwright, journalist, screenwriter and film director
- Silverio Vega (born 1956), Cuban American Democratic Party politician
- Silverio Visacro, engineer at the Universidade Federal de Minas Gerais (UFMG) in Belo Horizonte, Brazil

Surname:

- Dante Silverio (born 1937), Filipino painter, former basketball coach and former champion race car driver
- Elias Silvério (born 1986), Brazilian mixed martial artist
- Gustavo Perez Silverio, Cuban historian and pro-democracy activist
- Lorna Silverio (born 1948), Filipina politician
- Luis Silverio (born 1956), Dominican former professional baseball player and coach
- Nicasio Silverio (1930–2016), Cuban swimmer
- Rosa Silverio (born 1978), Dominican poet and storyteller
- Tom Silverio (1945–2011), Dominican professional baseball player
- Vittoria Di Silverio, Italian film, television, and stage actress

== See also ==
- Colégio Marista Dom Silvério, private Marist school in Belo Horizonte, in Brazil
- Dom Silvério, municipality in the Brazilian state of Minas Gerais
- Silveira
- Silveria
