= Pesci =

Pesci is an Italian surname. Notable people with the surname include:

- Adriana Pesci, Argentine mathematician and physicist
- Antonio Camillo Pesci (died 1521), Roman Catholic prelate
- Alessandro Pesci (born 1960), Italian film cinematographer
- Frank Pesci (1929–2015), American teacher, politician and lobbyist
- Gerolamo Pesci (1679–1759), Italian painter
- Joe Pesci (born 1943), American actor
- Nicolò Antonio Pesci (15th–16th century), Roman Catholic prelate
- Timothy Pesci (1944–2016), American politician
