= Giacomo Micalori =

Italian theologian, philosopher and astronomer

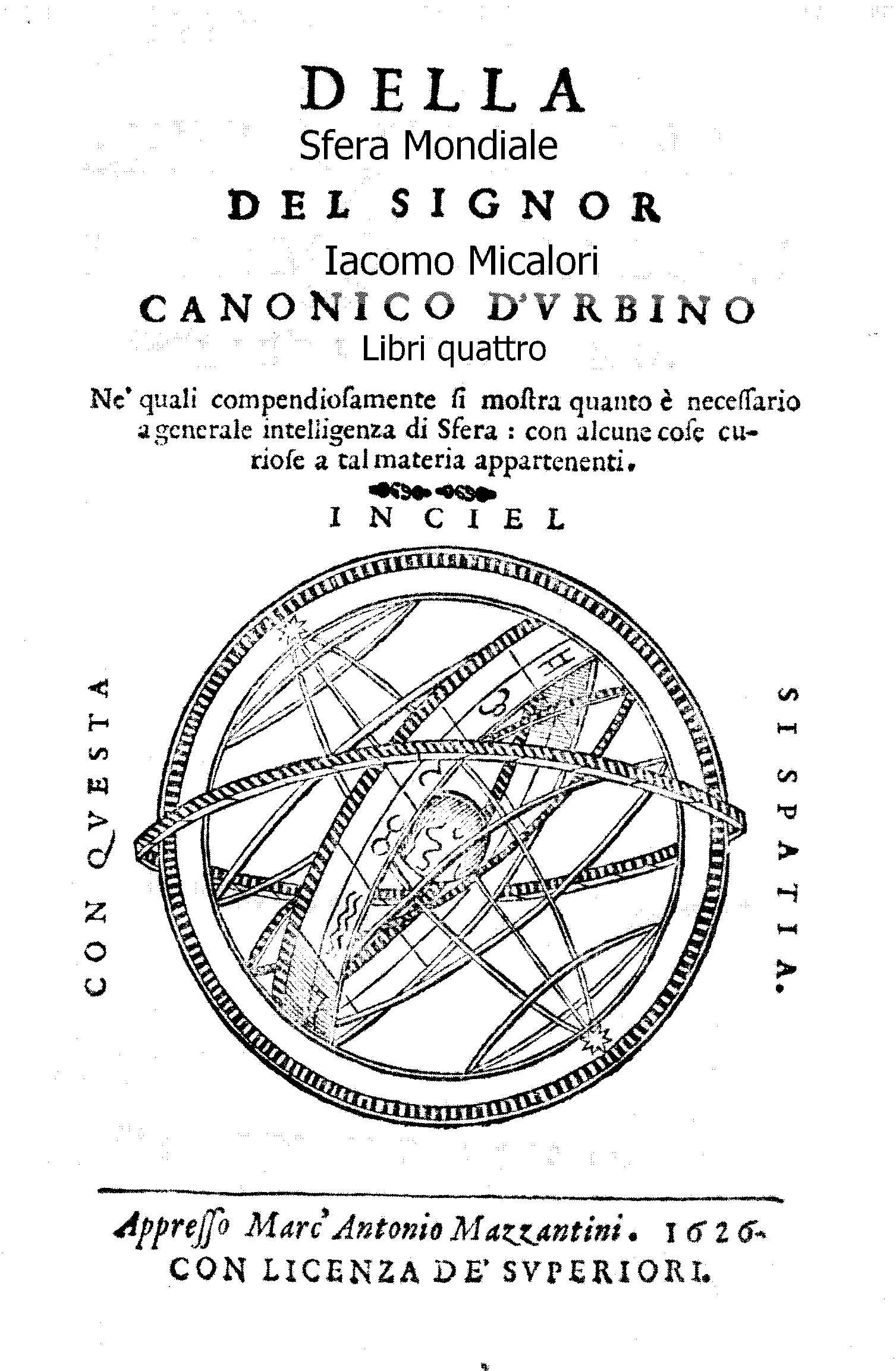
Della sfera mondiale, 1626

Giacomo Micalori (1570 – 1645) was an Italian theologian, philosopher and astronomer.

== Life ==
Born in Urbino in 1570, he became in 1600 a canon of the Urbino Cathedral. He was professor of theology and philosophy at the University of Urbino.

His main work in four books, Della sfera mondiale, printed in Urbino in 1626 by Marc' Antonio Mazzantini with many astronomical illustrations, is a relevant work of disclosure against judicial astrology, with details about telescope and zodiac.

He vigorously disputed with Erycius Puteanus (Erik van de Putte) about his proposal of a calendrical date line. He was also author of a comedy and a drama.

Death

He died in Urbino in 1645.

== Works ==
- Micalori, Giacomo (1626). Della sfera mondiale (in Italian). In Urbino: Marco Antonio Mazzantini.
- Micalori, Giacomo (1635). Antapocrisi (in Italian). In Roma: Francesco Roma Cavalli.
