= Silverio Petrucci =

Roman catholic bishop

Most Reverend Silverio Petrucci
- Bishop of Muro Lucano
- Church: Catholic Church
- Diocese: Diocese of Muro Lucano
- In office: 1541–1560
- Predecessor: Ascanio Parisani
- Successor: Flavio Orsini

Personal details
- Died: 1560 Muro Lucano, Italy

Silverio Petrucci (died 1560) was a Roman Catholic prelate who served as Bishop of Muro Lucano (1541–1560).

== Biography ==
On 27 June 1541, Silverio Petrucci was appointed during the papacy of Pope Paul III as Bishop of Muro Lucano. He served as Bishop of Muro Lucano until his death in 1560.

== External links and additional sources ==
- Cheney, David M. "Diocese of Muro Lucano". Catholic-Hierarchy.org. (for Chronology of Bishops) ^{[self-published]}
- Chow, Gabriel. "Diocese of Muro Lucano (Italy)". GCatholic.org. (for Chronology of Bishops) ^{[self-published]}

Catholic Church titles
Preceded by Ascanio Parisani	Bishop of Muro Lucano; 1541–1560	Succeeded by Flavio Orsini
