= Alfonso Pacella =

Italian Roman Catholic prelate

Most Reverend Alfonso Pacella
- Bishop of Muro Lucano
- Church: Catholic Church
- Diocese: Diocese of Muro Lucano
- In office: 1674–1702
- Predecessor: Francesco Maria Annoni
- Successor: Andrea Sarnelli

Orders
- Ordination: 17 Aug 1664
- Consecration: 7 Oct 1674 by Gasparo Carpegna

Personal details
- Born: 6 Nov 1630 Balvano, Italy
- Died: 31 Dec 1702 (age 72)

Alfonso Pacella (also Alfonso Pacelli) (1674–1702) was a Roman Catholic prelate who served as Bishop of Muro Lucano (1674–1702).

== Biography ==
Francesco Maria Annoni was born in Balvano, Italy on 6 Nov 1630 and ordained a priest on 17 Aug 1664. On 1 Oct 1674, he was appointed during the papacy of Pope Clement X as Bishop of Muro Lucano. On 7 Oct 1674, he was consecrated bishop in Rome by Gasparo Carpegna, Cardinal-Priest of San Silvestro in Capite. He served as Bishop of Muro Lucano until his death on 31 Dec 1702.

== See also ==
- Catholic Church in Italy

== External links and additional sources ==
- Cheney, David M. "Diocese of Muro Lucano". Catholic-Hierarchy.org. (for Chronology of Bishops) ^{[self-published]}
- Chow, Gabriel. "Diocese of Muro Lucano (Italy)". GCatholic.org. (for Chronology of Bishops) ^{[self-published]}

Catholic Church titles
Preceded by Francesco Maria Annoni	Bishop of Muro Lucano; 1674–1702	Succeeded by Andrea Sarnelli
