= Ambrogio Torriano =

17th-century Roman Catholic bishop

Most Reverend Ambrogio Torriano
- Bishop of Como
- Church: Catholic Church
- Diocese: Diocese of Como
- In office: 1666–1679
- Predecessor: Lazzaro Carafino
- Successor: Carlo Stefano Anastasio Ciceri

Orders
- Consecration: 15 Dec 1666 by Benedetto Odescalchi

Personal details
- Born: Indovero, Casargo, Italy
- Died: 9 Oct 1679

Ambrogio Torriano (died 1679) was a Roman Catholic prelate who served as Bishop of Como (1666–1679).

== Biography ==
Ambrogio Torriano was born in the village of Indovero in the comune of Casargo, Italy. In the papal consistory of 15 December 1666 he was appointed by Pope Alexander VII as Bishop of Como. On 21 December 1666 he was consecrated bishop by Benedetto Odescalchi, Cardinal-Priest of Sant'Onofrio, with Giacomo de Angelis, Archbishop of Urbino, and Marco Galli, Bishop of Rimini, serving as co-consecrators. He served as Bishop of Como until his death on 9 October 1679.

== External links and additional sources ==
- Cheney, David M. "Diocese of Como". Catholic-Hierarchy.org. (for Chronology of Bishops) ^{[self-published]}
- Chow, Gabriel. "Diocese of Como (Italy)". GCatholic.org. (for Chronology of Bishops) ^{[self-published]}

Catholic Church titles
Preceded by Lazzaro Carafino	Bishop of Como; 1666–1679	Succeeded by Carlo Stefano Anastasio Ciceri
