= Filesio Cittadini =

Italian Catholic bishop (f. 1562–1571)

Most Reverend Filesio Cittadini
- Bishop of Muro Lucano
- Church: Catholic Church
- Diocese: Diocese of Muro Lucano
- In office: 1562–1571
- Predecessor: Flavio Orsini
- Successor: Giulio Ricci

Filesio Cittadini was a Roman Catholic prelate who served as Bishop of Muro Lucano (1562–1571).

== Biography ==
On 6 July 1562, Filesio Cittadini was appointed Bishop of Muro Lucano by Pope Pius IV. He served as Bishop of Muro Lucano until his resignation on 16 November 1571.

== External links and additional sources ==
- Cheney, David M. "Diocese of Muro Lucano". Catholic-Hierarchy.org. (for Chronology of Bishops) ^{[self-published]}
- Chow, Gabriel. "Diocese of Muro Lucano (Italy)". GCatholic.org. (for Chronology of Bishops) ^{[self-published]}

Catholic Church titles
Preceded by Flavio Orsini	Bishop of Muro Lucano; 1562–1571	Succeeded by Giulio Ricci
