= Francesco Marinelli =

Italian Roman Catholic prelate (1935–2024)

His Excellency Francesco Marinelli
- Archbishop Emeritus of Urbino–Urbania–Sant'Angelo in Vado
- Archdiocese: Urbino–Urbania–Sant'Angelo in Vado
- Appointed: 11 March 2000
- Term ended: 24 June 2011
- Predecessor: Ugo Donato Bianchi
- Successor: Giovanni Tani

Orders
- Ordination: 25 March 1961 by Marcello Morgante
- Consecration: 29 April 2000 by Camillo Ruini

Personal details
- Born: 10 October 1935 Appignano del Tronto, Italy
- Died: 23 February 2024 (aged 88) Urbino
- Motto: PASTOR IN SANGUINE TESTAMENTI AETERNI
- Coat of arms

Styles of Francesco Marinelli
- Reference style: His Excellency; The Most Reverend
- Spoken style: Your Excellency
- Religious style: Archbishop

Francesco Marinelli (10 October 1935 – 23 February 2024) was an Italian Roman Catholic prelate. He was archbishop of Urbino–Urbania–Sant'Angelo in Vado from 2000 to 2011. Marinelli died in Urbino on 23 February 2024, at the age of 88.

Catholic Church titles
Preceded by Ugo Donato Bianchi	Archbishop of Urbino–Urbania–Sant'Angelo in Vado; 2000–2011	Succeeded by Giovanni Tani
