= Giacomo Accarisi =

Roman Catholic bishop

Most Reverend Giacomo Accarisi
- Bishop of Vieste
- Church: Catholic Church
- In office: 1644–1654
- Predecessor: Paolo Ciera
- Successor: Giovanni Mastelloni

Orders
- Consecration: 13 November 1644 by Cesare Facchinetti

Personal details
- Died: 1654 Vieste, Italy

Giacomo Accarisi (1599-1653) was a Roman Catholic prelate who served as Bishop of Vieste (1644–1654).

== Biography ==
Giacomo Accarisi was born in 1599. On 17 October 1644, he was appointed during the papacy of Pope Innocent X as Bishop of Vieste. On 13 November 1644, he was consecrated bishop by Cesare Facchinetti, Bishop of Senigallia, with Patrizio Donati, Bishop of Minori, and Bartolomeo Vannini, Bishop of Nepi e Sutri, serving as co-consecrators. He served as Bishop of Vieste until his death in 1654.

He taught rhetoric in Modena in 1627, and is remembered for publishing arguments against Galileo's notions that the earth orbits the sun.

== Episcopal succession ==
While bishop, he was the principal co-consecrator of:

- Ascanio Maffei, Archbishop of Urbino (1646);
- Mario Montani, Bishop of Nocera Umbra (1646); and
- Marco Romano (bishop) (Marco Cristalli), Bishop of Ruvo (1646).

== External links and additional sources ==
- Petrucci, Armando (1960). "ACCARISI, Giacomo". Dizionario Biografico degli Italiani (in Italian). Vol. 1: Aaron–Albertucci. Rome: Istituto dell'Enciclopedia Italiana. OCLC 883370.
- Cheney, David M. "Diocese of Vieste". Catholic-Hierarchy.org. (for Chronology of Bishops) ^{[self-published]}
- Chow, Gabriel. "Diocese of Vieste (Italy)". GCatholic.org. (for Chronology of Bishops) ^{[self-published]}

Catholic Church titles
Preceded by Paolo Ciera	Bishop of Vieste; 1644–1654	Succeeded by Giovanni Mastelloni
