= Giovanni Carlo Coppola =

Italian Roman Catholic prelate

Most Reverend Giovanni Carlo Coppola
- Bishop of Muro Lucano
- Church: Catholic Church
- Diocese: Diocese of Muro Lucano
- In office: 1643–1652
- Predecessor: Clemente Confetti
- Successor: Ascanio Ugolini

Personal details
- Born: Gallipoli, Italy
- Died: 1652 Muro Lucano, Italy

Giovanni Carlo Coppola (died 1606) was a Roman Catholic prelate who served as Bishop of Muro Lucano (1643–1652).

== Biography ==
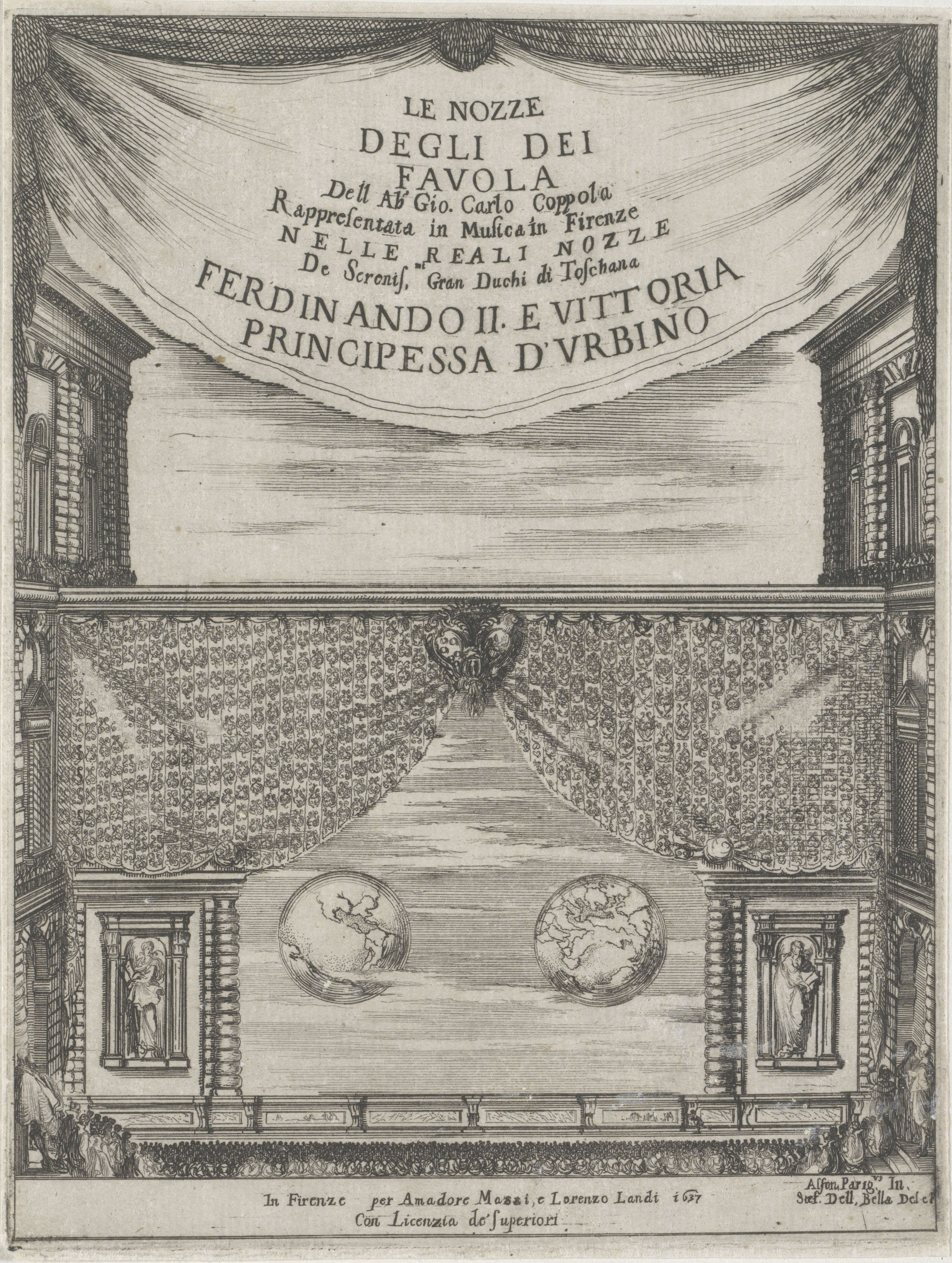
Giovanni Carlo Coppola. Le Nozze degli dei Favola dell'Ab Gio. Carlo Coppola. Rapprsentata in Musica in Firenze Nelle Reali Nozze di Ferdinandando II e Vittoria Principessa D'Urbino. Florence: Amadore Massi and Lorenzo Landi, 1637.

Giovanni Carlo Coppola was born in Gallipoli, Italy. On 18 May 1643, Giovanni Carlo Coppola was appointed during the papacy of Pope Urban VIII as Bishop of Muro Lucano. He served as Bishop of Muro Lucano until his death in 1652.

== External links and additional sources ==
- Cheney, David M. "Diocese of Muro Lucano". Catholic-Hierarchy.org. (for Chronology of Bishops) ^{[self-published]}
- Chow, Gabriel. "Diocese of Muro Lucano (Italy)". GCatholic.org. (for Chronology of Bishops) ^{[self-published]}

Catholic Church titles
Preceded by Clemente Confetti	Bishop of Muro Lucano; 1643–1652	Succeeded by Ascanio Ugolini
