= Diocese of Sant'Angelo in Vado =

Roman Catholic diocese in Italy (450-590, 1635-1986)

The Roman Catholic Diocese of Sant’Angelo in Vado is a suppressed diocese in Italy which is now part of the Archdiocese of Urbino–Urbania–Sant’Angelo in Vado.

== First Diocese ==
Around 450 a bishopric was established as the Diocese of Sant’Angelo in Vado, in Latin Tifernum Metaurense.

Only one bishop is known, Lucifer, who attended the Roman council held by Pope Hilarius in 465.

In 590 it was suppressed, its territory being partitioned, a part being used to establish the Diocese of Urbino and a part transferred to the pre-existent Diocese of Città di Castello.

== Second Diocese ==
On 2 August 1635 it was restored as Diocese of Sant’Angelo in Vado (Latin Tifernum Metaurense), regaining territory from the Abbacy nullius of San Cristoforo di Castel Durante, but was immediately and invariably held in personal union (United aeque principaliter) with the Diocese of Urbania (1635–1986). On 20 October 1636, in the bull "Cum nuper", Pope Urban VIII granted the diocese additional territory, taken from the Metropolitan Archdiocese of Urbino.

== Suppression ==
On 30 September 1986 it was suppressed, its territory being merged into the accordingly renamed Metropolitan Archdiocese of Urbino–Urbania–Sant’Angelo in Vado (which thus absorbed and preserved its title), without having had a single proper bishop other than the incumbents of the Urbania see.
