= Clemente Confetti =

Italian Catholic bishop (died 1644)

Most Reverend Clemente Confetti
- Bishop of Acerno
- Church: Catholic Church
- In office: 1643–1644
- Predecessor: Pietro Paolo Bonsi
- Successor: Camillo Ragona
- Previous posts: Titular Bishop of Tiberias (1623–1630); Bishop of Muro Lucano (1630–1643)

Orders
- Consecration: 22 January 1623 by Marco Antonio Gozzadini

Personal details
- Died: 1644 Acerno, Italy

Clemente Confetti or Clemente Confetto (died in 1644) was a Roman Catholic prelate who served as Bishop of Acerno (1643–1644), Bishop of Muro Lucano (1630–1643), and Titular Bishop of Tiberias (1623–1630).

== Biography ==
On 9 January 1623, Clemente Confetti was appointed Titular Bishop of Tiberias and Coadjutor Bishop of Muro Lucano by Pope Gregory XV. On 22 January 1623, he was consecrated bishop by Marco Antonio Gozzadini, Cardinal-Priest of Sant'Eusebio, with Alessandro Bosco, Bishop of Gerace, and Carlo Bovi, Bishop of Bagnoregio, serving as co-consecrators. He succeeded to the bishopric of Muro Lucano on 8 January 1630. On 13 April 1643, he was appointed Bishop of Acerno by Pope Urban VIII. He served as Bishop of Acerno until his death in 1644.

While bishop, he was the principal co-consecrator of Alessandro Sibilia, Bishop of Capri (1637).

== External links and additional sources ==
- Cheney, David M. "Tiberias (Titular See)". Catholic-Hierarchy.org. (for Chronology of Bishops) ^{[self-published]}
- Chow, Gabriel. "Titular Episcopal See of Tiberias (Italy)". GCatholic.org. (for Chronology of Bishops) ^{[self-published]}
- Cheney, David M. "Diocese of Muro Lucano". Catholic-Hierarchy.org. (for Chronology of Bishops) ^{[self-published]}
- Chow, Gabriel. "Diocese of Muro Lucano (Italy)". GCatholic.org. (for Chronology of Bishops) ^{[self-published]}
- Cheney, David M. "Diocese of Acerno". Catholic-Hierarchy.org. (for Chronology of Bishops) ^{[self-published]}
- Chow, Gabriel. "Diocese of Acerno". GCatholic.org. (for Chronology of Bishops) ^{[self-published]}

Catholic Church titles
Preceded by Johann Anton Tritt von Wilderen	Titular Bishop of Tiberias; 1623–1630	Succeeded by Gaspard Karas
Preceded by Tommaso Confetti	Bishop of Muro Lucano; 1630–1643	Succeeded by Giovanni Carlo Coppola
Preceded by Pietro Paolo Bonsi	Bishop of Acerno; 1643–1644	Succeeded by Camillo Ragona
