= Francesco Vitelli =

Francesco Vitelli (August 30, 1582–1646) was a Roman Catholic ecclesiastic in the papal service. He performed a number of diplomatic functions. He was a learned man and generous patron.

== Life ==
Decio Francesco Vitelli was born August 30, 1582 in Città di Castello. Francesco Vitelli was of the line of Vitelli who had been rich merchants of Città di Castello, who made themselves masters of the town in the early fourteenth century, after civic confrontations with the rival Guelfucci of Brancaleone, and henceforward wielded political and military influence disproportionate to their small territory.

He was the son of Vincenzo Vitelli (son of Alessandro Vitelli) and Faustina Vitelli (daughter of Chiappino); he thus belonged to the noble Vitelli family, both on his mother's and father's side: in fact, Vincenzo was Faustina's uncle. Francesco did not have the opportunity to meet his father, because Vincenzo was killed in 1583 in Rome, where he was general of the Pope's Infantry.

In 1612, Francesco was named referendary by Pope Paul V with the title titular archbishop of Thessalonica. Pope Gregory XV appointed him governor of San Severino Marche before transferring him to Ancona. In 1624 he was sent to govern Ascoli Piceno.

He was in Rome in 1625, where he was appointed a member of the Sacra Consulta, the Congregation of the Boundaries and a votary in the Supreme Tribunal of the Apostolic Signatura. Having thus attained a position of extreme importance, he was appointed commissioner several times: in 1630, to deal with the plague that threatened the Church State and in 1632 to act as diplomat between Ferrara and the Republic of Venice. In Venice itself he was apostolic nuncio for about 11 years, and it was thanks to his interventions that the Venetians did not declare war on the Pope several times.

On June 7, 1634, he was appointed apostolic administrator of Terni by Pope Urban VIII, a post he held until 1636, when he was appointed Archbishop of Urbino.

In 1643 Pope Urban VIII Barberini appointed him one of four prelati di fiocchetto, with the right to ornament the harness of their horses with violet and peacock-coloured feathers, as honorary Governor of Rome.

He was a correspondent of the papal diplomat Guido Bentivoglio, who addressed to him his Relationi concerning Flanders, 1633. Vitelli was a man of great culture, authoring a number of political and historical treatises, also taking care of translating some works and protecting some writers. A lover of books, paintings and archaeological objects, he was a learned man and generous patron.

Francesco Vitelli died in Urbino in 1646 and was buried in Rome, in the Vitelli Chapel in the church of San Marcello al Corso.

== External links and additional sources ==
- Cheney, David M. "Thessalonica (Titular See)". Catholic-Hierarchy.org. (for Chronology of Bishops (for Chronology of Bishops) ^{[self-published]}
- Chow, Gabriel. "Titular Metropolitan See of Thessalonica (Greece)". GCatholic.org. (for Chronology of Bishops (for Chronology of Bishops) ^{[self-published]}
- Cheney, David M. "Archdiocese of Urbino-Urbania-Sant'Angelo in Vado". Catholic-Hierarchy.org. (for Chronology of Bishops (for Chronology of Bishops) ^{[self-published]}

Catholic Church titles
Preceded by Giovanni Battista Agucchia	Apostolic Nuncio to Venice; 1632–1643	Succeeded by Angelo Cesi
Preceded by Giovanni Battista Maria Pallotta	Titular Archbishop of Thessalonica; 1632–1643	Succeeded by Cristofor Segni
Preceded by Antonio Santacroce	Archbishop of Urbino; 1643–1646	Succeeded by Ascanio Maffei
