= Giovanni Bonifacio Panella =

Italian Catholic bishop (died 1417)

Most Reverend Giovanni Bonifacio Panella
- Archbishop (Personal Title) of Muro Lucano
- Church: Catholic Church
- Diocese: Diocese of Muro Lucano
- In office: 1407–1417
- Successor: Guiduccio della Porta
- Previous posts: Bishop of Ferentino (1392–1395); Archbishop of Durrës (1395–1399); Archbishop (Personal Title) of Capaccio (1399–1407)

Orders
- Consecration: 23 April 1392 by Pietro Tomacelli

Personal details
- Died: 1417 Muro Lucano, Italy

Giovanni Bonifacio Panella (died 1417) was a Roman Catholic prelate who served as Archbishop (Personal Title) of Muro Lucano (1407–1417), Archbishop (Personal Title) of Capaccio (1399–1407), Archbishop of Durrës (1395–1399), and Bishop of Ferentino (1392–1395).

== Biography ==
On 8 March 1392, Giovanni Bonifacio Panella was appointed during the papacy of Pope Boniface IX as Bishop of Ferentino. On 23 April 1392, he was consecrated bishop by Pope Boniface IX. On 15 May 1395, he was appointed during the papacy of Pope Boniface IX as Archbishop of Durrës. On 16 May 1399, he was appointed during the papacy of Pope Boniface IX as Archbishop (Personal Title) of Capaccio. On 23 February 1407, he was appointed during the papacy of Pope Gregory XII as Archbishop (Personal Title) of Muro Lucano. He served as Bishop of Muro Lucano until his death in 1417.

== External links and additional sources ==
- Cheney, David M. "Diocese of Ferentino". Catholic-Hierarchy.org. (for Chronology of Bishops) ^{[self-published]}
- Chow, Gabriel. "Diocese of Ferentino (Italy)". GCatholic.org. (for Chronology of Bishops) ^{[self-published]}
- Cheney, David M. "Archdiocese of Tiranë-Durrës". Catholic-Hierarchy.org. (for Chronology of Bishops) ^{[self-published]}
- Chow, Gabriel. "Metropolitan Archdiocese of Tiranë–Durrës (Albania)". GCatholic.org. (for Chronology of Bishops) ^{[self-published]}
- Cheney, David M. "Diocese of Vallo della Lucania". Catholic-Hierarchy.org. (for Chronology of Bishops) ^{[self-published]}
- Chow, Gabriel. "Diocese of Vallo della Lucania (Italy)". GCatholic.org. (for Chronology of Bishops) ^{[self-published]}
- Cheney, David M. "Diocese of Muro Lucano". Catholic-Hierarchy.org. (for Chronology of Bishops) ^{[self-published]}
- Chow, Gabriel. "Diocese of Muro Lucano (Italy)". GCatholic.org. (for Chronology of Bishops) ^{[self-published]}

Catholic Church titles
Preceded by	Bishop of Ferentino; 1392–1395	Succeeded by Niccolò Vivari
Preceded by	Archbishop of Durrës; 1395–1399	Succeeded by
Preceded by	Archbishop (Personal Title) of Capaccio; 1399–1407	Succeeded by
Preceded by	Archbishop (Personal Title) of Muro Lucano; 1407–1417	Succeeded by Guiduccio della Porta
