= Antonio Altan San Vito =

Catholic Bishop of Urbino (1436–1450)

Most Reverend Antonio Altan San Vito
- Church: Catholic Church
- In office: 1436–1450
- Predecessor: Giacomo Balardi Arrigoni
- Successor: Latino Orsini

Antonio Altan San Vito (died 1450) was a Roman Catholic prelate who served as Bishop of Urbino (1436–1450).

== Biography ==
On 10 Feb 1436, Antonio Altan San Vito was appointed during the papacy of Pope Eugene IV as Bishop of Urbino. He served as Bishop of Urbino until his death in 1450.

While bishop, he was the principal co-consecrator of Heinrich Wagernin, Titular Bishop of Sebaste in Cilicia and Auxiliary Bishop of Kammin (1436).

== External links and additional sources ==
- Cheney, David M. "Archdiocese of Urbino-Urbania-Sant'Angelo in Vado". Catholic-Hierarchy.org. (for Chronology of Bishops) ^{[self-published]}
- Chow, Gabriel. "Archdiocese of Urbino-Urbania-Sant'Angelo in Vado (Italy)". GCatholic.org. (for Chronology of Bishops) ^{[self-published]}

Catholic Church titles
Preceded by Giacomo Balardi Arrigoni	Bishop of Urbino; 1436–1450	Succeeded by Latino Orsini
