= Francesco Maria Annoni =

Italian Roman Catholic prelate

Most Reverend Francesco Maria Annoni
- Bishop of Muro Lucano
- Church: Catholic Church
- Diocese: Diocese of Muro Lucano
- In office: 1660–1674
- Predecessor: Ascanio Ugolini
- Successor: Alfonso Pacella

Orders
- Consecration: 27 June 1660 by Giulio Cesare Sacchetti

Personal details
- Born: 1610 Milan, Italy
- Died: 12 May 1674 (age 64) Muro Lucano, Italy

Francesco Maria Annoni, C.R. (1610 – 12 May 1674) was a Roman Catholic prelate who served as Bishop of Muro Lucano (1660–1674).

== Biography ==
Francesco Maria Annoni was born in Milan, Italy in 1610 and ordained a priest in the Congregation of Clerics Regular of the Divine Providence. On 21 June 1660, he was appointed during the papacy of Pope Alexander VII as Bishop of Muro Lucano. On 27 June 1660, he was consecrated bishop by Giulio Cesare Sacchetti, Cardinal-Bishop of Sabina, with Lorenzo Gavotti, Bishop Emeritus of Ventimiglia, and Giovanni Agostino Marliani, Bishop Emeritus of Accia and Mariana, serving as co-consecrators. He served as Bishop of Muro Lucano until his death on 12 May 1674.

== Episcopal succession ==
While bishop, he was the principal co-consecrator of:

- Giovanni Carlo Baldovinetti, Bishop of Sansepolcro (1667); and
- Domenico Trucchi, Bishop of Mondovi (1667).

== See also ==
- Catholic Church in Italy

== External links and additional sources ==
- Cheney, David M. "Diocese of Muro Lucano". Catholic-Hierarchy.org. (for Chronology of Bishops) ^{[self-published]}
- Chow, Gabriel. "Diocese of Muro Lucano (Italy)". GCatholic.org. (for Chronology of Bishops) ^{[self-published]}

Catholic Church titles
Preceded by Ascanio Ugolini	Bishop of Muro Lucano; 1660–1674	Succeeded by Alfonso Pacella
