= Costanzo Fondulo =

Italian Roman Catholic prelate

Most Reverend Costanzo Fondulo
- Bishop of Cremona
- Church: Catholic Church
- Diocese: Diocese of Cremona
- In office: 1412–1423

Orders
- Consecration: 1412 by Giacomo Balardi Arrigoni

Personal details
- Died: 1423

Costanzo Fondulo (died 1423) was a Roman Catholic prelate who served as Bishop of Cremona (1412–1423).

== Biography ==
On 28 March 1412, Costanzo Fondulo was appointed Bishop of Cremona by Pope Gregory XII. In 1412, he was consecrated bishop by Giacomo Balardi Arrigoni, Bishop of Lodi, with Alessio di Siregno, Bishop of Piacenza, and Pietro Grassi, Bishop of Pavia, serving as co-consecrators. He served as Bishop of Cremona until his death in 1423.

== External links and additional sources ==
Catholic Church titles
Preceded by	Bishop of Cremona; 1412–1423	Succeeded by
