= Giulio Ricci =

1xth-century Roman Catholic bishop

Most Reverend Giulio Ricci
- Bishop of Teramo
- Church: Catholic Church
- Diocese: Diocese of Teramo
- In office: 1581–1592
- Predecessor: Giacomo Silverii-Piccolomini
- Successor: Vincenzo Bugiatti da Montesanto
- Previous posts: Bishop of Muro Lucano (1572–1575); Bishop of Gravina di Puglia (1575–1581)

Personal details
- Died: 3 July 1592

Giulio Ricci (died 1592) was a Roman Catholic prelate who served as Bishop of Teramo (1581–1592), Bishop of Gravina di Puglia (1575–1581), and Bishop of Muro Lucano (1572–1575).

== Biography ==
On 23 Jan 1572, Giulio Ricci was appointed during the papacy of Pope Pius V as Bishop of Muro Lucano. On 9 May 1575, he was appointed during the papacy of Pope Gregory XIII as Bishop of Gravina di Puglia. On 13 Nov 1581, he was appointed during the papacy of Pope Gregory XIII as Bishop of Teramo. He served as Bishop of Teramo until his death on 3 Jul 1592.

== Episcopal succession ==
While bishop, he was the principal co-consecrator of:

- Antonio Migliori, Bishop of San Marco (1586);
- Domenico Ginnasi, Archbishop of Manfredonia (1586);
- Orazio Marzani, Bishop of San Severino (1586); and
- Rutilio Benzoni, Bishop of Loreto (1586).

== External links and additional sources ==
- Cheney, David M. "Diocese of Muro Lucano". Catholic-Hierarchy.org. (for Chronology of Bishops) ^{[self-published]}
- Chow, Gabriel. "Diocese of Muro Lucano (Italy)". GCatholic.org. (for Chronology of Bishops) ^{[self-published]}
- Cheney, David M. "Diocese of Gravina". Catholic-Hierarchy.org. (for Chronology of Bishops) ^{[self-published]}
- Chow, Gabriel. "Diocese of Gravina (Italy)". GCatholic.org. (for Chronology of Bishops) ^{[self-published]}
- Cheney, David M. "Diocese of Teramo-Atri". Catholic-Hierarchy.org. (for Chronology of Bishops) ^{[self-published]}
- Chow, Gabriel. "Diocese of Teramo-Atri (Italy)". GCatholic.org. (for Chronology of Bishops) ^{[self-published]}

Catholic Church titles
Preceded by Filesio Cittadini	Bishop of Muro Lucano; 1572–1575	Succeeded by Daniele Vocazio
Preceded by Gastone Ettore Paganelli	Bishop of Gravina di Puglia; 1575–1581	Succeeded by Antonio Maria Manzoli
Preceded by Giacomo Silverii-Piccolomini	Bishop of Teramo; 1581–1592	Succeeded by Vincenzo Bugiatti da Montesanto
