= Giovanni Tani =

The Most Reverend Giovanni Tani
- Archbishop of Urbino-Urbania-Sant'Angelo in Vado
- Church: Roman Catholic Church
- Archdiocese: Urbino-Urbania-Sant'Angelo in Vado
- See: Urbino-Urbania-Sant'Angelo in Vado
- Appointed: 24 June 2011
- Installed: 17 September 2011
- Predecessor: Francesco Marinelli
- Previous post: Rector of the Pontifical Roman Major Seminary (2003-11)

Orders
- Ordination: 29 December 1973 by Emilio Biancheri
- Consecration: 17 September 2011 by Agostino Vallini

Personal details
- Born: Giovanni Tani; 8 April 1947 (age 79) Sogliano al Rubicone, Forlì-Cesena, Italy
- Education: Pontifical Roman Major Seminary; Pontifical Gregorian University; Pontifical Lateran University
- Motto: In unitate Spiritus Sanctus
- Coat of arms

Styles of Giovanni Tani
- Reference style: The Most Reverend
- Spoken style: Your Excellency
- Religious style: Monsignor
- Posthumous style: none

Giovanni Tani JCL (born 8 April 1947) is the current archbishop of Urbino-Urbania-Sant'Angelo in Vado since his appointment was announced on 24 June 2011. He had previously served as rector of the Pontifical Roman Seminary.

Tani was born in Sogliano al Rubicone, Forlì-Cesena, Italy, in the diocese of Rimini. After discerning a vocation to the priesthood he studied at the Minor Seminary of Rimini and then to the Regional Seminary of Bologna. He was a student at the Pontifical Roman Major Seminary. He later attended the Pontifical Gregorian University, obtaining his degree in Spiritual Theology. He went on to obtain a licentiate in Canon Law at the Pontifical Lateran University. He was ordained priest on 29 December 1973 for the Diocese of Rimini.

In the ministry has held the following positions: Director of Spiritual Seminary in Rimini, from 1974 to 1985, Spiritual Director of the Pontifical Roman Major Seminary, from 1985 to 1999, and pastor of Our Lady of Lourdes in Tormarancia in Rome, from 1999 to 2003, Rector of the Pontifical Roman Major Seminary, Rector of the Church of the Four Crowned Saints at the Lateran, a member of the Priests' Council, Member of the Diocesan Pastoral Council, President of the Missionary Institute Imperial Borromeo since 2003; Assistant Spiritual Apostolate Salvatorian Academic, 2006.

In 1992 he was appointed chaplain of His Holiness. As per the norms of canon law he most be ordained to the episcopate within four months of appointment being announced.

He was ordained a bishop by Agostino Cardinal Vallini Vicar General of Rome on 17 September 2011. The principal co-consecrators was Bishop Francesco Lambiasi bishop of Rimini and Archbishop Francesco Marinelli archbishop emeritus of Urbino-Urbania-Sant'Angelo in Vado.
