= Andrea Veroli =

Italian Roman Catholic prelate

Most Reverend Andrea Veroli
- Bishop of Camerino
- Church: Catholic Church
- Diocese: Diocese of Camerino
- In office: 1464–1478
- Predecessor: Alessandro Oliva
- Successor: Fabrizio Varano
- Previous posts: Bishop of Conversano (1437–1439); Bishop of Boiano (1439–1452); Bishop of Urbino (1452–1463); Bishop of Muro Lucano (1463–1464)

Personal details
- Died: 1478 Camerino, Italy

Andrea Veroli (died 1478) was a Roman Catholic prelate who served as bishop of Camerino (1464–1478), bishop of Muro Lucano (1463–1464), bishop of Urbino (1452–1463), bishop of Boiano (1439–1452), and bishop of Conversano (1437–1439).

== Biography ==
Veroli was appointed on 29 April 1437, during the papacy of Pope Eugene IV, as bishop of Conversano, and then as bishop of Boiano on 25 September 1439. This was followed by an appointment as bishop of Urbino on 11 September 1452, during the papacy of Pope Nicholas V; when Pope Pius II, Veroli was appointed bishop of Muro Lucano on 26 May 1463. Finally, Veroli was appointed bishop of Camerino on 8 October 1464 during the papacy of Pope Paul II, a position in which Veroli served until death, in 1478.

While bishop, Veroli was the principal co-consecrator of Thomas Scrope, auxiliary bishop of Norwich (1450); and Johann Goldener, auxiliary bishop of Bamberg (1451).

== External links and additional sources ==
- Cheney, David M. "Diocese of Conversano-Monopoli". Catholic-Hierarchy.org. (for Chronology of Bishops) ^{[self-published]}
- Chow, Gabriel. "Diocese of Conversano-Monopoli (Italy)". GCatholic.org. (for Chronology of Bishops) ^{[self-published]}
- Cheney, David M. "Archdiocese of Campobasso–Boiano". Catholic-Hierarchy.org. (for Chronology of Bishops) ^{[self-published]}
- Chow, Gabriel. "Metropolitan Archdiocese of Campobasso–Boiano (Italy)". GCatholic.org. (for Chronology of Bishops) ^{[self-published]}
- Cheney, David M. "Archdiocese of Urbino-Urbania-Sant'Angelo in Vado". Catholic-Hierarchy.org. (for Chronology of Bishops) ^{[self-published]}
- Chow, Gabriel. "Archdiocese of Urbino-Urbania-Sant'Angelo in Vado (Italy)". GCatholic.org. (for Chronology of Bishops) ^{[self-published]}
- Cheney, David M. "Diocese of Muro Lucano". Catholic-Hierarchy.org. (for Chronology of Bishops) ^{[self-published]}
- Chow, Gabriel. "Diocese of Muro Lucano (Italy)". GCatholic.org. (for Chronology of Bishops) ^{[self-published]}
- Cheney, David M. "Archdiocese of Camerino-San Severino Marche". Catholic-Hierarchy.org. (for Chronology of Bishops) ^{[self-published]}
- Chow, Gabriel. "Archdiocese of Camerino–San Severino Marche (Italy)". GCatholic.org. (for Chronology of Bishops) ^{[self-published]}

== Books ==
- Eubel, Konrad (1914). Hierarchia catholica medii et recentioris aevi (in Latin). Vol. II (second ed.). Münster: Libreria Regensbergiana. p. 116.

Catholic Church titles
Preceded by Marino Orsini	Bishop of Conversano; 1437–1439	Succeeded by Donato Bottini
Preceded by	Bishop of Boiano; 1439–1452	Succeeded by
Preceded by Latino Orsini	Bishop of Urbino; 1452–1463	Succeeded by Girolamo Staccoli
Preceded by Barnaba de Molina	Bishop of Muro Lucano; 1463–1464	Succeeded by Meolo de Mascabruni
Preceded by Alessandro Oliva	Bishop of Camerino; 1464–1478	Succeeded by Fabrizio Varano
