= Fabrizio Varano =

Italian Roman Catholic prelate

Most Reverend Fabrizio Varano
- Bishop of Camerino
- Church: Catholic Church
- Diocese: Diocese of Camerino
- In office: 1482–1508
- Predecessor: Andrea Veroli
- Successor: Sisto Gara della Rovere

Personal details
- Died: 7 March 1508 Camerino, Italy

Fabrizio Varano (died 1508) was a Roman Catholic prelate who served as Bishop of Camerino (1482–1508).

== Biography ==
On 13 June 1482, Fabrizio Varano was appointed during the papacy of Pope Julius II as Bishop of Camerino. He served as Bishop of Camerino until his death on 7 March 1508.

== External links and additional sources ==
- Cheney, David M. "Archdiocese of Camerino–San Severino Marche". Catholic-Hierarchy.org. (for Chronology of Bishops) ^{[self-published]}
- Chow, Gabriel. "Archdiocese of Camerino–San Severino Marche (Italy)". GCatholic.org. (for Chronology of Bishops) ^{[self-published]}

Catholic Church titles
Preceded by Andrea Veroli	Bishop of Camerino; 1482–1508	Succeeded by Sisto Gara della Rovere
