= Cesare Carpano =

Italian Roman Catholic prelate (died 1528)

Most Reverend Cesare Carpano
- Bishop of Muro Lucano
- Church: Catholic Church
- Diocese: Diocese of Muro Lucano
- In office: 1521–1528
- Predecessor: Antonio Camillo Pesci
- Successor: Matteo Griffoni Pioppi

Personal details
- Died: 1528 Muro Lucano, Italy

Cesare Carpano (died 1528) was a Roman Catholic prelate who served as Bishop of Muro Lucano (1521–1528).

== Biography ==
On 6 September 1521, Cesare Carpano was appointed Bishop of Muro Lucano by Pope Leo X. He served as Bishop of Muro Lucano until his death in 1528.

== External links and additional sources ==
- Cheney, David M. "Diocese of Muro Lucano". Catholic-Hierarchy.org. (for Chronology of Bishops) ^{[self-published]}
- Chow, Gabriel. "Diocese of Muro Lucano (Italy)". GCatholic.org. (for Chronology of Bishops) ^{[self-published]}

Catholic Church titles
Preceded by Antonio Camillo Pesci	Bishop of Muro Lucano; 1521–1528	Succeeded by Matteo Griffoni Pioppi
