= Giacomo Balardi Arrigoni =

Italian bishop

Most Reverend Giacomo Balardi Arrigoni
- Bishop of Urbino
- Church: Catholic Church
- Diocese: Diocese of Urbino
- In office: 1424–1435
- Successor: Antonio Altan San Vito
- Previous posts: Bishop of Lodi (1407–1418); Bishop of Trieste (1418–1424)

Personal details
- Died: 12 September 1435 Urbino, Italy

Giacomo Balardi Arrigoni (died 12 September 1435) was a Roman Catholic prelate who served as Bishop of Urbino (1424–1435), Bishop of Trieste (1418–1424), and Bishop of Lodi (1407–1418).

== Biography ==
Giacomo Balardi Arrigoni was ordained a priest in the Order of Preachers. On 26 February 1407, he was appointed during the papacy of Pope Gregory XIII as Bishop of Lodi. On 10 January 1418, he was appointed during the papacy of Pope Martin V as Bishop of Trieste. On 11 December 1424, he was appointed during the papacy of Pope Martin V as Bishop of Urbino. He served as Bishop of Urbino until his death on 12 September 1435.

While bishop, he was the principal co-consecrator of Costanzo Fondulo, Bishop of Cremona (1412), and Girolamo de Pola, Bishop of Capodistria (1421).

== External links and additional sources ==
- Cheney, David M. "Diocese of Lodi". Catholic-Hierarchy.org. (for Chronology of Bishops) ^{[self-published]}
- Chow, Gabriel. "Diocese of Lodi (Italy)". GCatholic.org. (for Chronology of Bishops) ^{[self-published]}
- Cheney, David M. "Diocese of Trieste". Catholic-Hierarchy.org. (for Chronology of Bishops) ^{[self-published]}
- Chow, Gabriel. "Diocese of Trieste (Italy)". GCatholic.org. (for Chronology of Bishops) ^{[self-published]}
- Cheney, David M. "Archdiocese of Urbino-Urbania-Sant'Angelo in Vado". Catholic-Hierarchy.org. (for Chronology of Bishops) ^{[self-published]}
- Chow, Gabriel. "Archdiocese of Urbino-Urbania-Sant'Angelo in Vado (Italy)". GCatholic.org. (for Chronology of Bishops) ^{[self-published]}

Catholic Church titles
Preceded by	Bishop of Lodi; 1407–1418	Succeeded by Gerardo Landriani
Preceded by	Bishop of Trieste; 1418–1424	Succeeded by Enea Silvio Piccolomini
Preceded by	Bishop of Urbino; 1424–1435	Succeeded by Antonio Altan San Vito
