= Dionisio Laurerio =

Italian Catholic cleric

His Eminence Dionysio Laurerio
- Cardinal-Priest
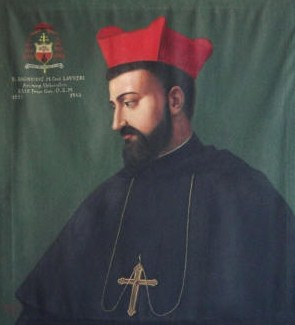
- Church: San Marcello al Corso (1539-1542)
- Diocese: Urbino (1540-1542)

Orders
- Created cardinal: 19 December 1539 by Pope Paul III
- Rank: Cardinal Priest

Personal details
- Born: Dionysio Laurerio; 1497 Benevento
- Died: 15 September 1542 (aged 44–45) Rome
- Buried: San Marcello
- Residence: Rome
- Occupation: diplomat, administrator Superior General of Servite Order
- Profession: bishop
- Education: University of Bologna

Dionisio Laurerio (1497–1542) (also known as fra Dionisio da Benevento and as the Cardinal of San Marcello) was an Italian Catholic cleric who was the superior general of the Servite Order from 1535 to 1542, a cardinal from 1539, and a bishop from 1540.

== Biography ==
=== Early years, 1497–1535 ===
Dionisio Laurerio was born in Benevento in 1497. He was from a little-known family with links to the Pedicini family, a local patrician family. Both of his parents were originally from Florence.

He entered the Servite Order at a young age and was educated by his order. From December 1514, he is reported to be among the brothers of the Order studying at Bologna. He obtained a doctorate in theology in 1521. After he was ordained as a priest, he became a lector of philosophy, metaphysics, mathematics, and theology at the University of Perugia (1521—1525), and the University of Bologna (1525—1529), then at the Sapienza University of Rome.

At a chapter of the Servite Order held in Cesena on 18 May 1528, Laurerio was elected procurator of the Servite Order at the Roman Curia, a choice which was confirmed at the next Chapter meeting, held at Faenza. He was approved by the Vicar General of the Order, Fra Leonardo of Brescia. He was also a papal Penitentiary of the Basilica of S. Peter and S. Paul, attested in 1530.

On 5 November 1531, the Prior General of the Servites, Jerónimo de Lucca (1523-1535), detached the new monastery called "Il Mergollino" from the jurisdiction of the Order's Neapolitan province, and assigned Fr. Dionysio to be its Vicar Perpetuus with full powers. Laurerio had been the organizer of the monastery and its properties in the immediately preceding years, the gift of the humanist Jacopo Sannazzaro.

In 1534, when Thomas Cranmer, the representative of King Henry VIII of England at the papal Court, returned to England, having been approved as Archbishop of Canterbury by Pope Clement VII, Cranmer made such a good report of Laurerio's friendliness and usefulness in doing the king's business, that Henry named Laurerio as Cranmer's successor at the papal court. Laurerio traveled to London to deal with urgent religious matters in the Kingdom of England.

At that time, he developed a friendship with Cardinal Alessandro Farnese, the future Pope Paul III, who he probably already knew from Benevento, and who made Laurerio his theologian in sacris. Laurerio also developed friendships with humanist Jacopo Sannazzaro and Cardinals Reginald Pole and Jacopo Sadoleto.

At the end of 1534, Laurerio and other negotiators from the Servite Order met with their Protector, Cardinal Antonio Sanseverino, to resolve some difficulties which had arisen between the superiors of the Order and the General Congregation. The judgment of Cardinal Sanseverino was announced on 23 December 1534.

=== Superior General of the Servite Order, 1535–1539 ===
In 1534, after the election of Pope Paul III (Farnese) on 13 October, the Servite general, Jerónimo de Lucca, was deluged with various contentions, complaints, slanders, and accusations against himself before the pope. Tired, and wishing to avoid all the unpleasantness, he went to the pope, laid the seals of his office at the pope's feet, and abdicated his office. Pope Paul III thereupon promoted Laurerio to the post vicar general of the Servite Order on 22 January 1535, to serve until a General Chapter was summoned and elected a successor to Jerónimo de Lucca. On 27 April 1535, at a chapter celebrated in Bologna, the Servite Order elected Laurerio to be its superior general. He resigned this post in May 1542. While he was superior general, the pope gave him the faculties necessary to found, visit, and reform any monasteries of his order.

On 23 October 1536 the pope named Laurerio his nuncio to James V of Scotland. His assignment was to report on the desirability of holding an ecumenical council. He was also given the powers of a legate a latere to visit and reform institutions in the Kingdom of Scotland, to prevent them from joining Henry VIII of England in breaking with Rome. Laurerio met James in Paris on 27 January 1537 and probably never actually visited Scotland. He convinced the king to support an ecumenical council, but was unable to convince the cloistered brethren of the Kingdom of France to agree.

The nuncio was back in Rome by 11 May 1537, when he executed some leases. Pope Paul III, in beginning the process of reform of the Roman Curia, appointed a commission of cardinals (Contarini, Carafa, Simonetta and Ghinucci) to hold discussions and produce a plan of reform of the Apostolic Datary, the office that filled vacant benefices. A serious issue immediately arose, over the question of compulsory payments for a benefice received; in the eyes of many, such "compositions" amounted to simony. In autumn 1537, Laurerio participated in discussions on the reforming proposal, and wrote for the cardinals a memorandum entitled Compositionum defensio, arguing for a moderate reform against the strict view later adopted by the cardinals.

In December 1538, while on an inspection tour of houses of his Order, he took part in the provincial Chapter of Lombardy, held at Scandia, north of Alessandria.

=== Cardinal, 1539–42 ===
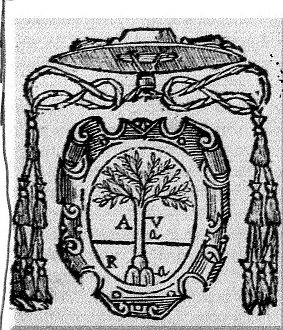
Coat of arms of Cardinal Dionisio Laurerio

Pope Paul III created Dionisio Laurerio a cardinal priest in the consistory of 19 December 1539. He received the red hat on 22 December 1539, and the titular church of San Marcello al Corso on 28 January 1540.

On 13 February 1540, he was appointed ("elected") Bishop of Urbino by Pope Paul III. He took possession of the see on 3 March 1540. In early August 1540 he accompanied the pope to Lucca to meet Charles V, Holy Roman Emperor to discuss convening an ecumenical council in Vicenza.

In poor health, he then went to rest in convents in northern Tuscany, at Pistoia, Prato, and then Florence for a few months. He also acted as papal nuncio to Cosimo de' Medici during this period. He also played a crucial role in restoring the baths of Bagni San Filippo. He also stopped in Urbino to begin the canonization process for the Servite Girolamo Ranuzzi, installing his relics in that city. On 27 August 1540 the pope assigned him and Cardinals Gasparo Contarini and Gian Pietro Carafa to a committee to study proposals to reform the Apostolic Penitentiary; this commission met sporadically.

In spring 1541, the pope despatched Cardinal Laurerio to Modena as pontifical inquisitor delegate for the process against writer Giovanni Bertario. Bertario had been excommunicated in absentia; together with Cardinal Alessandro Farnese, Cardinal Laurerio had this sentence reduced, ordering Bertario to recant his allegedly heretical statements.

In the consistory of 27 May 1541 Cardinal Gasparo Contarini's report from the Diet of Ratisbon was read and discussed. He presented a proposal for reconciliation with the Protestants, supported by Alvise Priuli. Cardinal Laurerio vehemently opposed this proposal.

Cardinal Laurerio announced his intention of resigning as superior general of the Servite Order in a letter of 24 March 1542, and he therefore convoked a general chapter of the Order, to meet in Faenza. On 17 May 1542, his successor, Agostino Bonucci, was elected.

When, on 21 July 1542, Pope Paul III issued the papal bull Licet ab initio, reorganizing the Roman Inquisition, Laurerio was named one of the six cardinal inquisitors of the reformed Inquisition.

On 11 August 1542 the pope named him papal legate in Benevento and provisor of the province of Campagna e Marittima.

He died in Rome on 17 September 1542 after a brief illness. He was buried in his titular church of San Marcello al Corso, and his memorial inscription was placed by the Prior General of the Servites, Agostino Bonucci (1542–1553).

== Bibliography ==
- Giani, Arcangelo (1721). Annalium Sacri Ordinis Fratrum Servorum B. Mariae Virginis (in Latin). Vol. Tomus secundus. Typis Salvatoris, Et Joan-Dominici Marescandoli. pp. 110–129.
- Laurelli, Fiorenzo (1997). "La porpora e l'armilla. Vita ed opere del Cardinale Dionisio Laurerio." Rivista storica del Sannio, III Serie, Anno IV, Napoli 1997. (in Italian)
- Ragagli, Simone (2005). "LAURERIO, Dionisio." Dizionario Biografico degli Italiani. Volume 64 (Treccani: 2005) (in Italian)
