= Barnaba de Molina =

Italian Roman Catholic prelate

Most Reverend Barnaba de Molina
- Bishop of Muro Lucan
- Church: Catholic Church
- Diocese: Diocese of Muro Lucano
- In office: 1443–1462
- Predecessor: Giovanni Sanfelice
- Successor: Andrea Veroli

Personal details
- Died: 1462 Muro Lucano, Italy

Barnaba de Molina (died 1462) was a Roman Catholic prelate who served as Bishop of Muro Lucano (1443–1462).

== Biography ==
On 26 August 1443, Barnaba de Molina was appointed during the papacy of Pope Eugene IV as Bishop of Muro Lucano. He served as Bishop of Muro Lucano until his death in 1462.

== External links and additional sources ==
- Cheney, David M. "Diocese of Muro Lucano". Catholic-Hierarchy.org. (for Chronology of Bishops) ^{[self-published]}
- Chow, Gabriel. "Diocese of Muro Lucano (Italy)". GCatholic.org. (for Chronology of Bishops) ^{[self-published]}

Catholic Church titles
| Preceded by Giovanni Sanfelice | Bishop of Muro Lucano; 1443–1462 | Succeeded by Andrea Veroli |
