= Alessio di Siregno =

Most Reverend Alessio di Siregno
- Bishop of Piacenza
- Church: Catholic Church
- Diocese: Diocese of Piacenza
- In office: 1411–1447
- Predecessor: Branda Castiglione
- Successor: Nicolò Amidano
- Previous posts: Bishop of Bobbio (1405–1409); Bishop of Gap (1409–1411)

Personal details
- Died: 1 January 1447

Alessio di Siregno, O.F.M. or Alexis de Siregno or Alessio da Seregno was a Roman Catholic prelate who served as Bishop of Bobbio (1405–1409), Bishop of Gap (1409–1411), and Bishop of Piacenza (1411–1447).

== Biography ==
A native of Milan, Alessio di Siregno was ordained a priest in the Order of Friars Minor. He obtained the degree of master of theology, and became a celebrated preacher.

On 26 Sep 1405, he was appointed Bishop of Bobbio by Pope Innocent VII.

Alessio attended the Council of Pisa, where Pope Benedict XIII (Avignon Obedience) and Pope Gregory XII (Roman Obedience) were declared to be heretics and schismatics, and were deposed. On 20 Aug 1409, he was appointed by the newly elected Pope Alexander V as Bishop of Gap. At Aix, on 24 January 1411, he did his homage to Queen Yolande, the Countess of Provence.

On 27 Aug 1411, he was appointed Bishop of Piacenza by Pope John XXIII. He refused to accept the appointment, and made an appeal to the ecumenical council which was being contemplated, and which actually took place in Constance beginning in November 1414. The mere mention of an appeal to a council brought him a letter from Pope John dated 12 January 1412, ordering the officials of the bishops of Nice, Embrun, and Grenoble, to expel Bishop Alessio from Gap and incarcerate him. Alessio took up his bishopric in Piacenza. While bishop, he was the principal co-consecrator of Costanzo Fondulo, Bishop of Cremona (1412). He attended the Council of Constance (1414–1418). In 1425, with the consent of Pope Martin V, he granted possession of the monastery of San Sisto to the Benedictine Order of Monte Cassino of S. Giustino of Padua. He attended the Council of Basel, which was summoned by Martin V, and which opened on 14 December 1431

He served as Bishop of Piacenza until his death in Cremona on 1 January 1447. His body was transported to Piacenza, where he was buried in the Cathedral.

== Sources ==
- Albanés, Joseph Hyacinthe; Fillet, Louis; Chevalier, Ulysse (1899). Gallia christiana novissima: Aix, Apt, Fréjus, Gap, Riez et Sisteron (in French). Montbéliard: Société anonyme d'imprimerie montbéliardaise. pp. 508–510.
- Campi, Pietro Maria (1662). Dell' historia ecclesiastica di Piacenza (in Italian). Vol. III. Piacenza: Per Giouanni Bazachi.
- Cappelletti, Giuseppe (1859). Le chiese d'Italia: dalla loro origine sino ai nostri giorni (in Italian). Vol. Tomo decimoquinto (15). Venezia: G. Antonelli. pp. 46–47.
- Eubel, Conradus, ed. (1913). Hierarchia catholica (in Latin). Vol. Tomus 1 (second ed.). Münster: Libreria Regensbergiana. (in Latin)
- Ughelli, Ferdinando; Coleti, Niccolo (1717). Italia sacra sive de Episcopis Italiae (in Latin). Vol. Tomus secundus (II) (secunda ed.). Venice: Apud Sebastianum Coleti. p. 232.

Catholic Church titles
Preceded by Uberto Torano	Bishop of Bobbio; 1405–1409	Succeeded by Lancellotto Fontana
Preceded by Antoine Juvénis	Bishop of Gap; 1409–1411	Succeeded by Laugier Sapor
Preceded by Branda Castiglione	Bishop of Piacenza; 1411–1447	Succeeded by Nicolò Amidano
