= Ascanio Maffei =

1xth-century Roman Catholic bishop

Most Reverend Ascanio Maffei
- Archbishop of Urbino
- Church: Catholic Church
- Archdiocese: Archdiocese of Urbino
- In office: 1646–1659
- Predecessor: Francesco Vitelli
- Successor: Giacomo de Angelis

Orders
- Consecration: 1 Jul 1646 by Marcello Lante della Rovere

Personal details
- Born: Rome, Italy
- Died: Oct 1659

Ascanio Maffei (died 1659) was a Roman Catholic prelate who served as Archbishop of Urbino (1646–1659).

== Biography ==
Ascanio Maffei was born in Rome, Italy. On 25 Jun 1646, he was appointed during the papacy of Pope Innocent X as Archbishop of Urbino. On 1 Jul 1646, he was consecrated bishop by Marcello Lante della Rovere, Cardinal-Bishop of Ostia e Velletri, with Ranuccio Scotti Douglas, Bishop Emeritus of Borgo San Donnino, and Giacomo Accarisi, Bishop of Vieste, serving as co-consecrators. He served as Archbishop of Urbino until his death in Oct 1659.

While bishop, he was the principal co-consecrator of Flavio Galletti, Bishop of Anglona-Tursi (1646) .

== External links and additional sources ==
- Cheney, David M. "Archdiocese of Urbino-Urbania-Sant'Angelo in Vado". Catholic-Hierarchy.org. (for Chronology of Bishops) ^{[self-published]}
- Chow, Gabriel. "Archdiocese of Urbino-Urbania-Sant'Angelo in Vado (Italy)". GCatholic.org. (for Chronology of Bishops) ^{[self-published]}

Catholic Church titles
Preceded by Francesco Vitelli	Archbishop of Urbino; 1646–1659	Succeeded by Giacomo de Angelis
