= Giovanni Sanfelice =

Italian Roman Catholic prelate

Most Reverend Giovanni Sanfelice
- Bishop of Muro Lucano
- Church: Catholic Church
- Diocese: Diocese of Muro Lucano
- In office: 1423–1443
- Predecessor: Guiduccio della Porta
- Successor: Barnaba de Molina
- Previous post: Bishop of Alessano (1405–1423)

Giovanni Sanfelice was a Roman Catholic prelate who served as Bishop of Muro Lucano (1423–1443) and Bishop of Alessano (1405–1423).

== Biography ==
On 12 October 1405, Giovanni Sanfelice was appointed during the papacy of Pope Innocent VII as Bishop of Alessano. On 24 September 1423, he was appointed during the papacy of Pope Martin V as Bishop of Muro Lucano. He served as Bishop of Muro Lucano until his resignation in 1443.

While bishop, he was the principal consecrator of Antonio Guidotti, Bishop of Conversano (1424).

== External links and additional sources ==
- Cheney, David M. "Diocese of Muro Lucano". Catholic-Hierarchy.org. (for Chronology of Bishops) ^{[self-published]}
- Chow, Gabriel. "Diocese of Muro Lucano (Italy)". GCatholic.org. (for Chronology of Bishops) ^{[self-published]}
- Cheney, David M. "Diocese of Alessano". Catholic-Hierarchy.org. (for Chronology of Bishops) ^{[self-published]}
- Chow, Gabriel. "Titular Episcopal See of Alessano (Italy)". GCatholic.org. (for Chronology of Bishops) ^{[self-published]}

Catholic Church titles
Preceded by	Bishop of Alessano; 1405–1423	Succeeded by
Preceded by Guiduccio della Porta	Bishop of Muro Lucano; 1423–1443	Succeeded by Barnaba de Molina
