= Giacomo de Angelis =

17th-century Catholic cardinal

His Eminence Giacomo de Angelis
- Cardinal-Priest of Santa Maria in Ara Coeli
- Church: Catholic Church

Orders
- Consecration: 3 Oct 1660 by Giulio Cesare Sacchetti

Personal details
- Born: 13 Oct 1610 Pisa, Italy
- Died: 15 Sep 1695 (age 84)

Giacomo de Angelis (1610–1695) was a Roman Catholic cardinal.

== Biography ==
On 3 Oct 1660, he was consecrated bishop Giulio Cesare Sacchetti, Cardinal-Bishop of Sabina.

== Episcopal succession ==
While bishop, he was the principal consecrator of:

- Ambrogio Torriano, Bishop of Como (1666);
- Pietro Lanfranconi, Bishop of Terni (1667);
- Galeazzo Marescotti, Titular Archbishop of Corinthus (1668);
- Ferdinando Tiberius Gonzaga, Bishop of Mantova (1671);
- Tommaso de Franchi, Bishop of Melfi e Rapolla (1671);
- Lodovico Malaspina, Bishop of Sansepolcro (1672);
- Sebastiano d'Alessandro, Bishop of Ruvo (1672);
- Giacomo Buoni, Bishop of Montefeltro (1672);
- Giovanni Battista Desio, Bishop of Venosa (1674);
- Raffaele Riario Di Saono, Bishop of Montepeloso (1674);
- Mario Emmanuelle Durazzo, Bishop of Aleria (1674);
- Matteo Orlandi, Bishop of Cefalù (1674);
- Girolamo Valvassori, Bishop of Pesaro (1677);
- Antonio Savo de' Panicoli, Bishop of Termoli (1678);
- Marcantonio Zollio, Bishop of Crema (1678);
- Paolo Pecci, Bishop of Massa Marittima (1679);
- Giulio Vincenzo Gentile, Archbishop of Genova (1681);
- Giuseppe Nicola Gilberti, Bishop of Teano (1681);
- Ottavio Paravicino, Bishop of Mileto (1681);
- Pietro Pietra (Petria), Bishop of Colle di Val d'Elsa (1681);
- Stefano Ricciardi, Bishop of Nepi e Sutri (1681);
- Giacomo Antonio Morigia, Bishop of San Miniato (1681);
- Francesco Maria Caffori (Cafferi), Bishop of Castro di Puglia (1681); and
- Gianfrancesco Ginetti, Archbishop of Fermo (1684).

He also presided over the priestly ordination of St. Giuseppe Maria Tomasi di Lampedusa, (1673).

Catholic Church titles
Preceded by Ascanio Maffei	Archbishop of Urbino; 1660–1667	Succeeded by Callisto Puccinelli
Preceded by Giacomo Franzoni	Cardinal-Priest of Santa Maria in Ara Coeli; 1686–1695	Succeeded by Gianfrancesco Negroni
