= Ascanio Ugolini =

Italian Roman Catholic bishop

Most Reverend Ascanio Ugolini
- Bishop of Muro Lucano
- Church: Catholic Church
- Diocese: Diocese of Muro Lucano
- In office: 1652–1660
- Predecessor: Giovanni Carlo Coppola
- Successor: Francesco Maria Annoni

Orders
- Consecration: 3 Mar 1652 by Fabio Chigi

Personal details
- Died: May 1660

Ascanio Ugolini (died 1660) was a Roman Catholic prelate who served as Bishop of Muro Lucano (1652–1660).

== Biography ==
On 9 Feb 1652, Ascanio Ugolini was appointed Bishop of Muro Lucano by Pope Innocent X. On 3 Mar 1652, he was consecrated bishop by Fabio Chigi, Secretary of State, with Girolamo Boncompagni, Archbishop of Bologna, and Ranuccio Scotti Douglas, Bishop Emeritus of Borgo San Donnino, serving as co-consecrators. He served as Bishop of Muro Lucano until his death in May 1660.

== External links and additional sources ==
- Cheney, David M. "Diocese of Muro Lucano". Catholic-Hierarchy.org. (for Chronology of Bishops) ^{[self-published]}
- Chow, Gabriel. "Diocese of Muro Lucano (Italy)". GCatholic.org. (for Chronology of Bishops) ^{[self-published]}

Catholic Church titles
Preceded by Giovanni Carlo Coppola	Bishop of Muro Lucano; 1652–1660	Succeeded by Francesco Maria Annoni
