= Guiduccio della Porta =

Italian Roman Catholic prelate

Most Reverend Guiduccio della Porta
- Bishop of Muro Lucan
- Church: Catholic Church
- Diocese: Diocese of Muro Lucano
- In office: 1418–1423
- Predecessor: Giovanni Bonifacio Panella
- Successor: Giovanni Sanfelice

Personal details
- Died: 1423 Muro Lucano, Italy

Guiduccio della Porta (died 1423) was a Roman Catholic prelate who served as Bishop of Muro Lucano (1418–1423)

On 19 February 1418, Guiduccio della Porta was appointed during the papacy of Pope Martin V as Bishop of Muro Lucano. He served as Bishop of Muro Lucano until his death in 1423.

== External links and additional sources ==
- Cheney, David M. "Diocese of Muro Lucano". Catholic-Hierarchy.org. (for Chronology of Bishops) ^{[self-published]}
- Chow, Gabriel. "Diocese of Muro Lucano (Italy)". GCatholic.org. (for Chronology of Bishops) ^{[self-published]}

Catholic Church titles
Preceded by Giovanni Bonifacio Panella	Bishop of Muro Lucano; 1418–1423	Succeeded by Giovanni Sanfelice
