= Ascanio Parisani =

Italian Roman Catholic bishop and cardinal

His Eminence Ascanio Parisani
- Bishop of Rimini
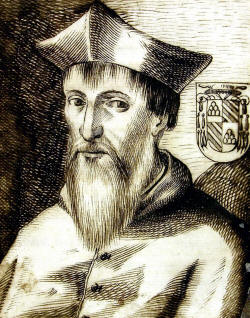
- Church: Catholic Church
- Diocese: Rimini
- Appointed: 24 May 1529
- Term ended: 3 April 1549
- Predecessor: Fabio Cerri dell'Anguillara
- Successor: Giulio Parisani
- Other posts: Cardinal-Priest of Santa Pudenziana (1540-1549)
- Previous posts: Bishop of Caiazzo (1528-1529); Administrator of Muro Lucano (1540-1541); Camerlengo of the College of Cardinals (1546-1547)

Orders
- Consecration: 20 June 1529 by Gabriele Foschi
- Created cardinal: 19 December 1539 by Pope Paul III
- Rank: Cardinal-Priest

Personal details
- Born: 1500 Tolentino, Italy
- Died: 3 April 1549 (aged 48–49) Rome, Papal States
- Buried: San Marcello al Corso

Ascanio Parisani (died 1549) was an Italian Roman Catholic bishop and cardinal.

== Biography ==
Ascanio Parisani was born into a noble family in Tolentino.

In 1520, he became a canon of the cathedral chapter of Cesena Cathedral. Early in his career, he served as secretary to Cardinal Antonio Maria Ciocchi del Monte.

On 3 January 1528 he was elected bishop of Caiazzo. He was consecrated as a bishop by Gabriele Foschi, Archbishop of Durrës, in the Sistine Chapel on 20 June 1529. He was transferred to the see of Rimini on 24 May 1529. He was also a canon of the cathedral chapter of Pisa Cathedral until 1534, and of the churches of Saint-Denis and of Saint-Servat of Utrecht until 1535. From 1536 until 12 October 1538 he was a scriptor of apostolic briefs.

Pope Paul III made him a cardinal priest in the consistory of 19 December 1539. He received the red hat and the titular church of Santa Pudenziana on 28 January 1540.

He served as administrator of the see of Muro Lucano from 15 November 1540 until 27 June 1541. From 27 January 1542 to 1545 he was the papal legate in Umbria and Perugia. In 1543, he became the cardinal protector of the Servite Order. From 1545 to 1547 he was the papal legate to Charles V, Holy Roman Emperor. He also served as Camerlengo of the Sacred College of Cardinals from 8 January 1546 to 7 January 1547. On 13 May 1547 he became papal legate in the Campagne and Maritime Province.

He died in Rome on 3 April 1549. He was buried in San Marcello al Corso.
