= Nicolò Antonio Pesci =

Most Reverend Nicolò Antonio Pesci
- Bishop of Muro Lucan
- Church: Catholic Church
- Diocese: Diocese of Muro Lucano
- In office: 1486–1517
- Predecessor: Meolo de Mascabruni
- Successor: Antonio Camillo Pesci

Nicolò Antonio Pesci or Nicolò Antonio Piscibus was a Roman Catholic prelate who served as Bishop of Muro Lucano (1486–1517).

== Biography ==
On 15 February 1486, Nicolò Antonio Pesci was appointed Bishop of Muro Lucano by Pope Innocent VIII. He served as Bishop of Muro Lucano until his resignation in 1517. While bishop, he was the principal co-consecrator of principal co-consecrator of Antonio Maria Ciocchi del Monte, Bishop of Città di Castello (1506).

Catholic Church titles
Preceded by Meolo de Mascabruni	Bishop of Muro Lucano; 1486–1517	Succeeded by Antonio Camillo Pesci
