= Gustavo Perez Silverio =

Cuban historian and pro-democracy activist

Gustavo Perez Silverio is a Cuban historian and pro-democracy activist.

In February 2015, he was fired from his job as a professor of history at the University "Marta Abreu" of Las Villas in Santa Clara, Cuba. On June 11, 2015, Republican Congresswoman Ileana Ros-Lehtinen spoke in his defense for one minute before the United States House of Representatives.
