= Silverio García Lara =

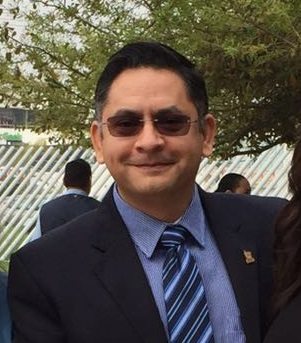
Dr. Silverio García-Lara

Silverio García Lara is a Mexican plant biology researcher. He is the head of AgroBio Unit and a professor of Nutri-Omics Group with the Monterrey Institute of Technology and Higher Studies, Campus Monterrey within the National School of Science.

== Early life ==
García-Lara obtained his PhD in Experimental Biology from the Autonomous Metropolitan University during which he attended the University of Ottawa in Canada and subsequently completed Postdoctoral studies at the International Center for Maize and Wheat Improvement, CIMMYT, Int.

== Career ==
From 2006 to 2008 he was the head of Entomology Unit at the Global Maize Program of CIMMYT. In 2009 he was invited as a visiting scientist at Global ICARDA-CIMMYT-IITA Maize Program.

He is an Associate Professor and Senior Scientist at the National School of Science and Technology at Tecnologico de Monterrey. Among his main achievements he developed, improved and characterized storage pest-resistant corn and corn with nutraceutical properties. He developed comprehensive technologies of global food security to reduce post-harvest problems in Latin America, Africa and Asia. García Lara worked on ways reduced the amount of food loss in storage, especially of corn, coffee, and rice. He and two students discovered anti-cancer properties in Mexican oregano and corn. He received financial support from agencies and foundations such as FEMSA, CONACYT, SAGARPA, USDA-USA, CIDA-CANADA, CIMMYT MasAgro, GrainPro, Monsanto, and Kellogg's.

His work in molecular breeding, postharvest biotechnology, and nutraceutical bio-characterization was recognized by the Canadian Foundation for the International Conference on Agricultural Biotechnology (ABIC), The Consultative Group on International Agriculture (CGIAR), AGROBIO Mexico and the Institute of Nutrition of BIMBO Group. He was recognized at the second Convención Latinoamericana hermetic storage in Guatemala for the testing of special plastic bags for grain storage. In 2012 he got the Teaching and Research Award from Tecnologico de Monterrey. He became a regular member of the Mexican Academy of Science in 2014. Mexico's Sistema Nacional de Investigadores recognized his work with Level 3 membership.

García Lara has presented more than 200 abstracts at national and international conferences along with more than 100 publications, ten book chapters, three books, four patents, and dozens of outreach lectures at various national and international forums.

== See also ==
- List of Monterrey Institute of Technology and Higher Education faculty
