= Urbino Cathedral =

Catholic cathedral in Urbino, Italy

Coordinates: 43°43′30″N 12°38′11″E

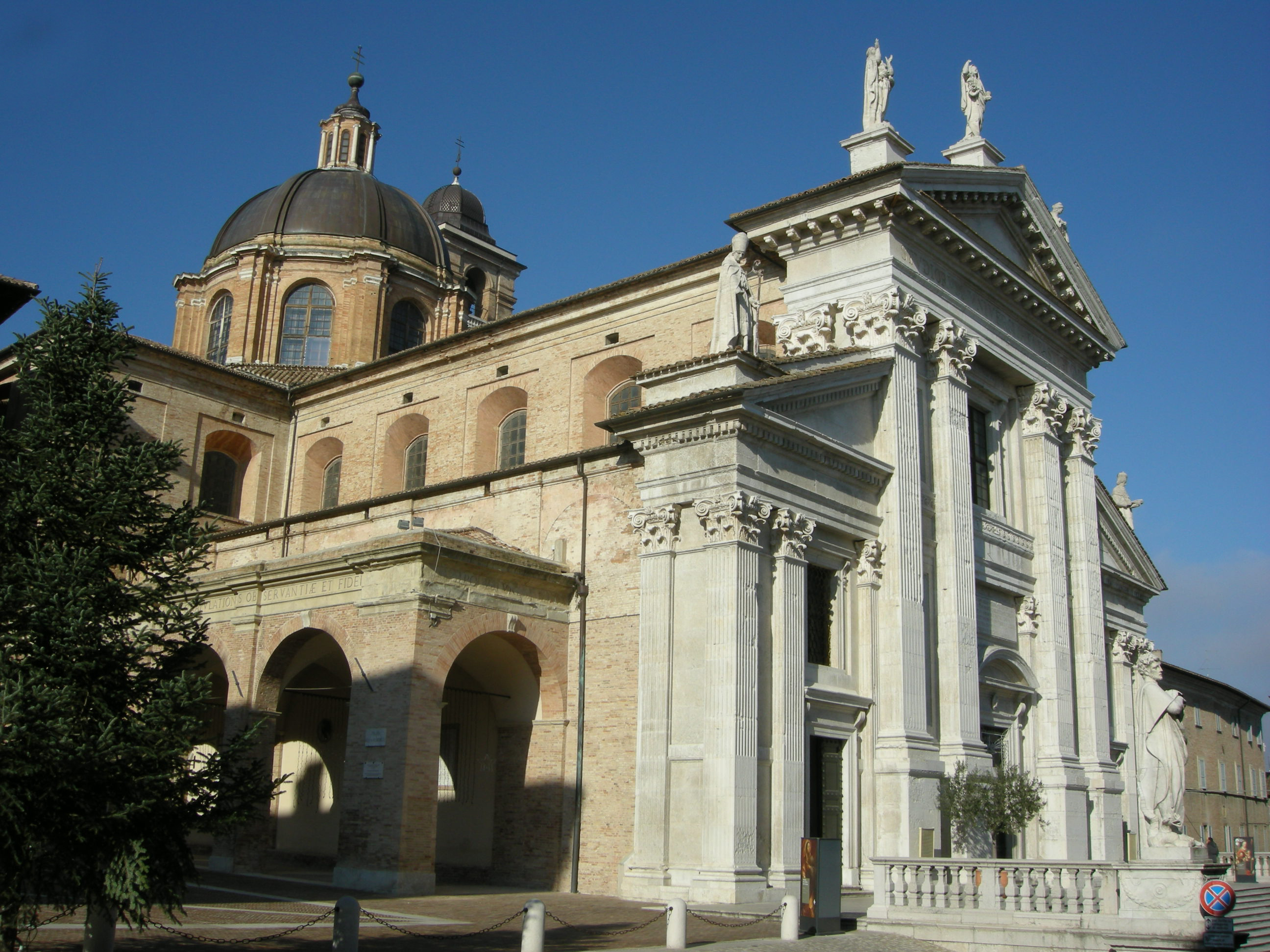
West front, seen from the north

Urbino Cathedral (Italian: Duomo di Urbino, Cattedrale Metropolitana di Santa Maria Assunta) is a Catholic cathedral in the city of Urbino, Italy, dedicated to the Assumption of the Blessed Virgin Mary. Since 1986 it has been the seat of the Archbishop of Urbino-Urbania-Sant'Angelo in Vado, and was previously the seat of the Archbishops of Urbino. The cathedral is part of the Historic Centre of Urbino, which was designated as a UNESCO World Heritage Site in 1998 for its outstanding Renaissance architecture and historical significance.

== History ==
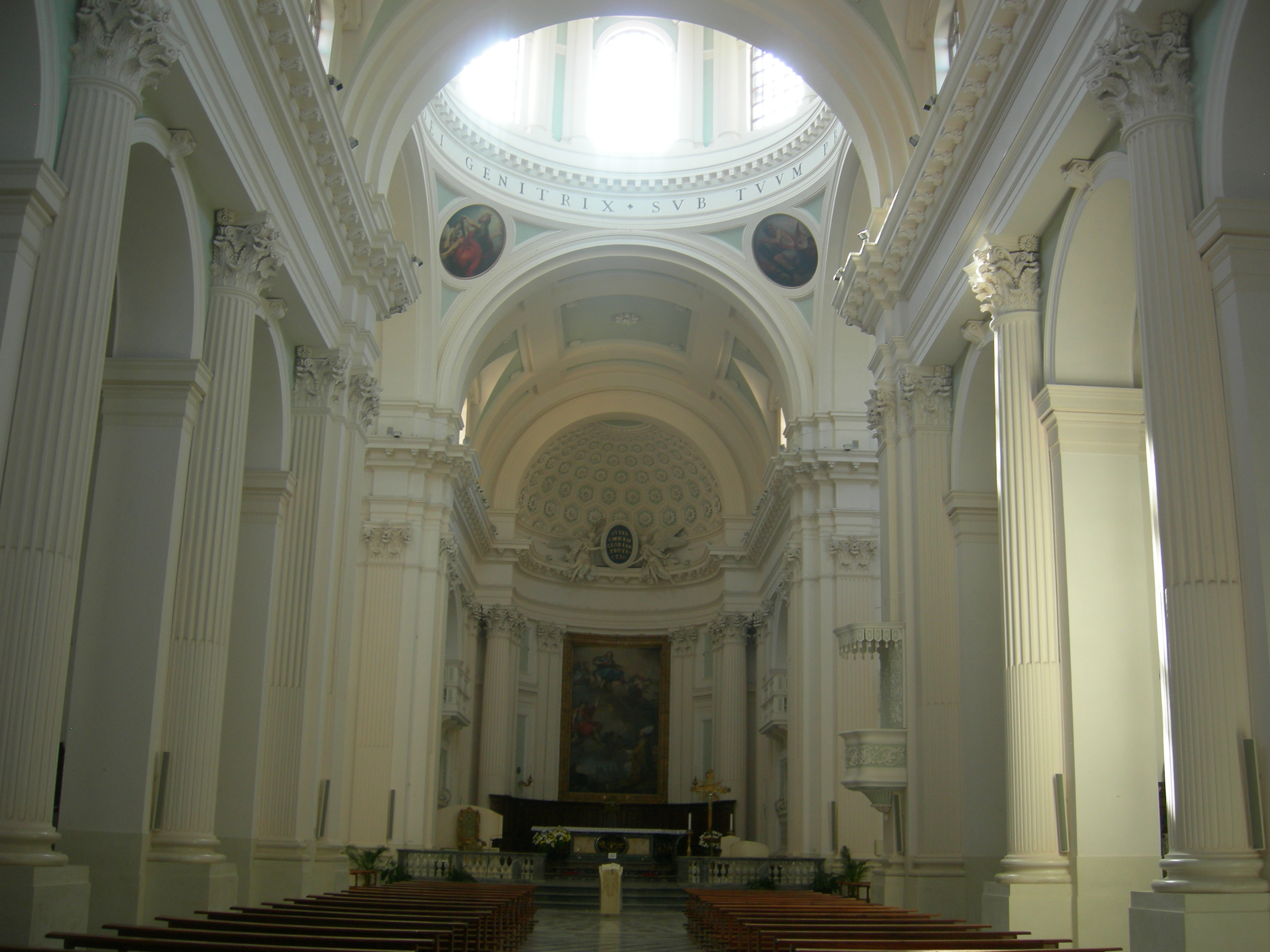
Interior

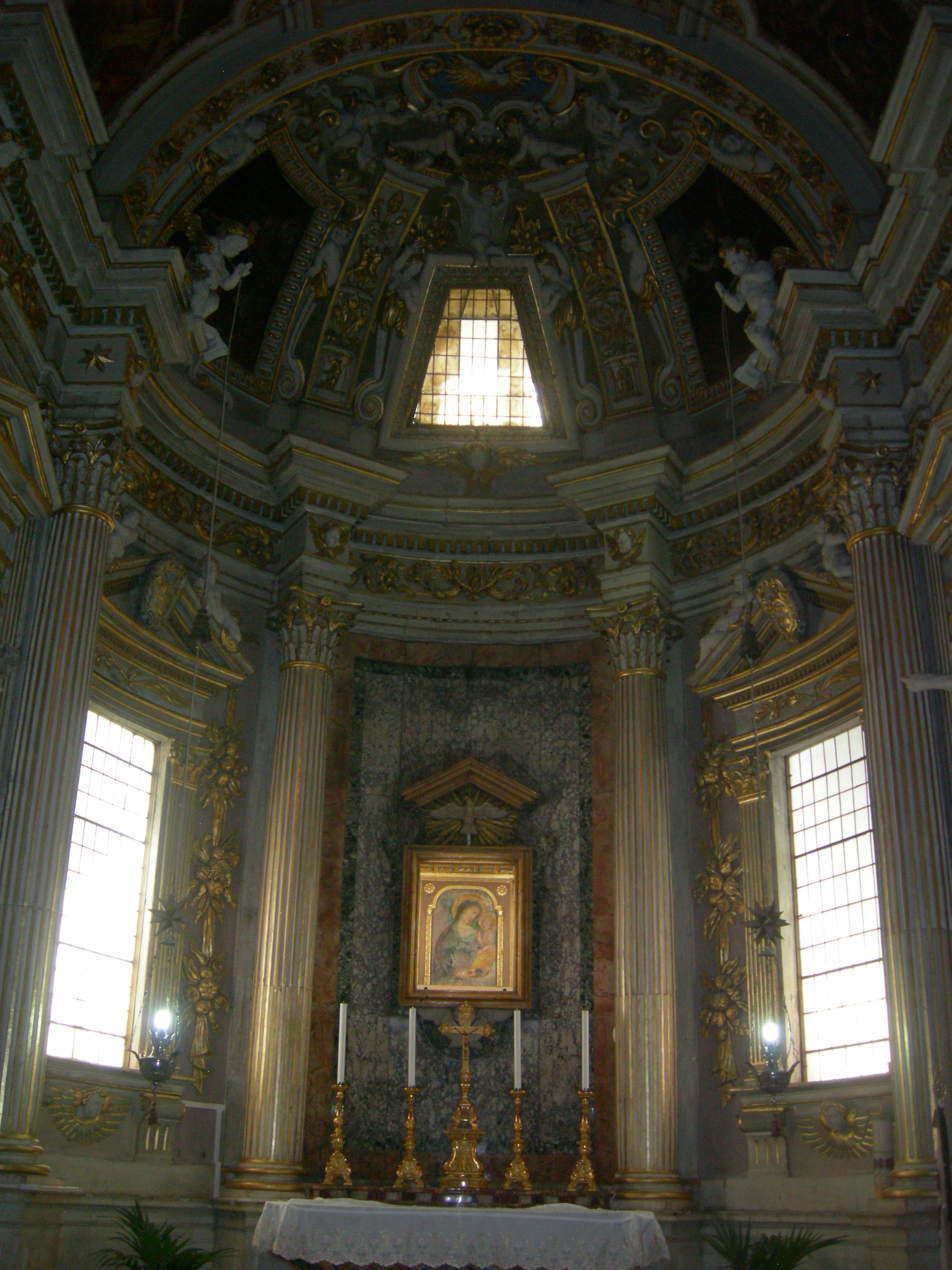
Chapel of the Immaculate Conception

The first cathedral on the site was built here in 1021, to replace an earlier one located outside the city walls. Under the patronage of Count Federico da Montefeltro, it was rebuilt in the 15th century, based on a design attributed to Francesco di Giorgio Martini. Construction was not finished until 1604. The west front, using stone quarried from Furlo, was designed by Camillo Morigia and completed in 1782. It was ornamented with five statues, representing the three theological virtues of Faith, Hope, and Charity, between Saint Augustine to the left and Saint John Chrysostom to the right.

On 12 January 1789, a powerful earthquake toppled the cupola, and made a reconstruction necessary. The project was entrusted to Giuseppe Valadier, and completed by 1801 in the present Neoclassical style.

== Interior ==
Valadier's Neoclassical interior is on a Latin cross groundplan and has a central nave between two side aisles, under a barrel vaulted roof. The crossing of the transept supports an impressive coffered cupola.

As to works of art, the cathedral contains two canvases by Federico Barocci, a Saint Sebastian in the north aisle, and a Last Supper in the Chapel of the Holy Sacrament. There is also an Assumption of the Virgin (circa 1707) by Carlo Maratta, and a Nativity (1708) by Carlo Cignani. On the pendentives of the cupola are depicted the Four Evangelists (18th century), possibly by Domenico Corvi and Giuseppe Cades. The main altarpiece, by Christopher Unterberger, represents the Madonna between the city's patron saints.

== Tomb of Polydore Vergil ==
The humanist scholar and historian Polydore Vergil died in Urbino in 1555, and was buried in the cathedral, in the chapel of St Andrew which he himself had endowed. It was agreed in 1613 that a memorial stone should be set over his tomb. This was eventually put in place in 1631, with an inscription stating that his fame would "live for ever in the world". However, it is believed to have been lost in the 1789 earthquake.

== Gallery ==
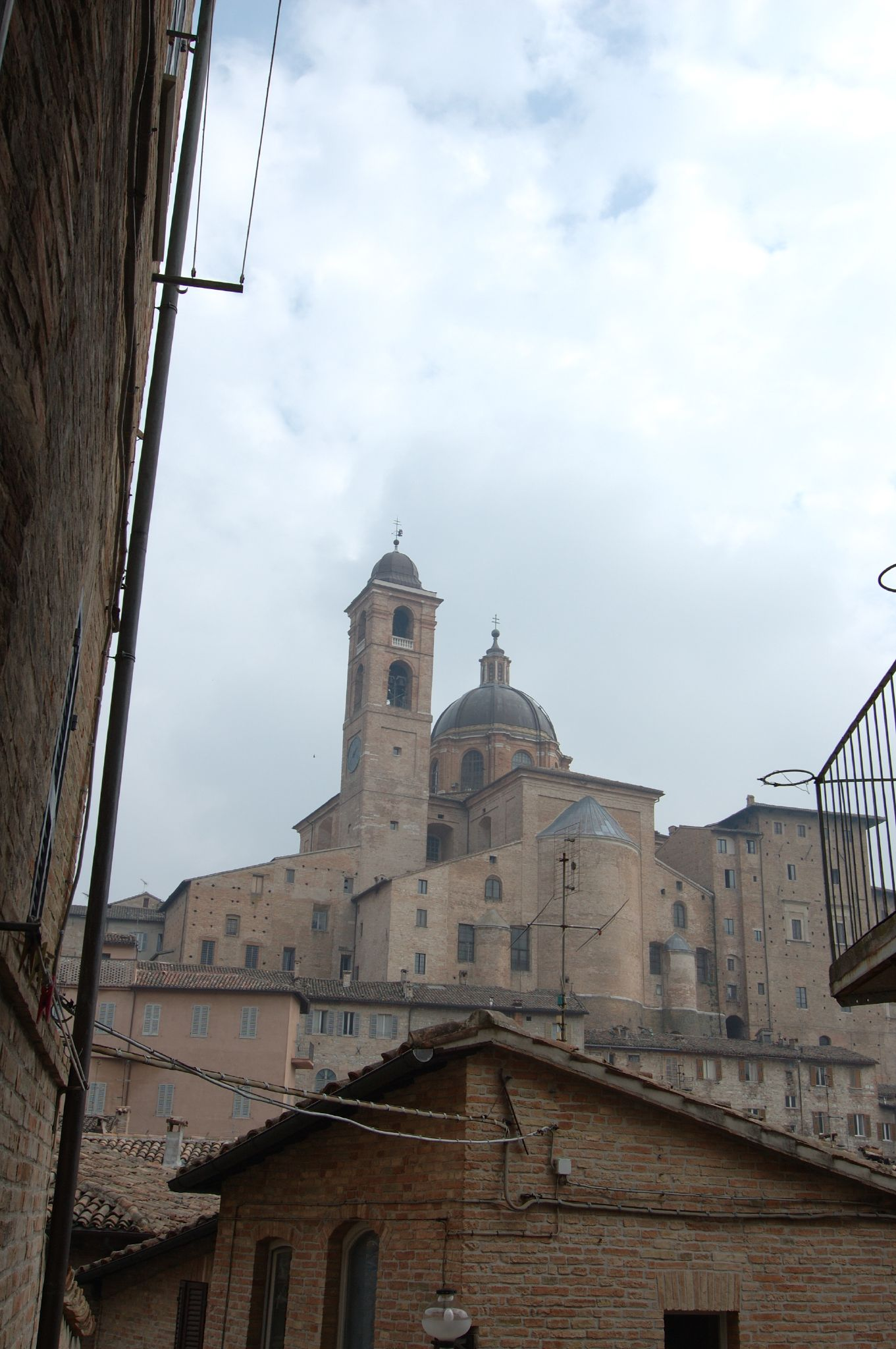
Apse exterior

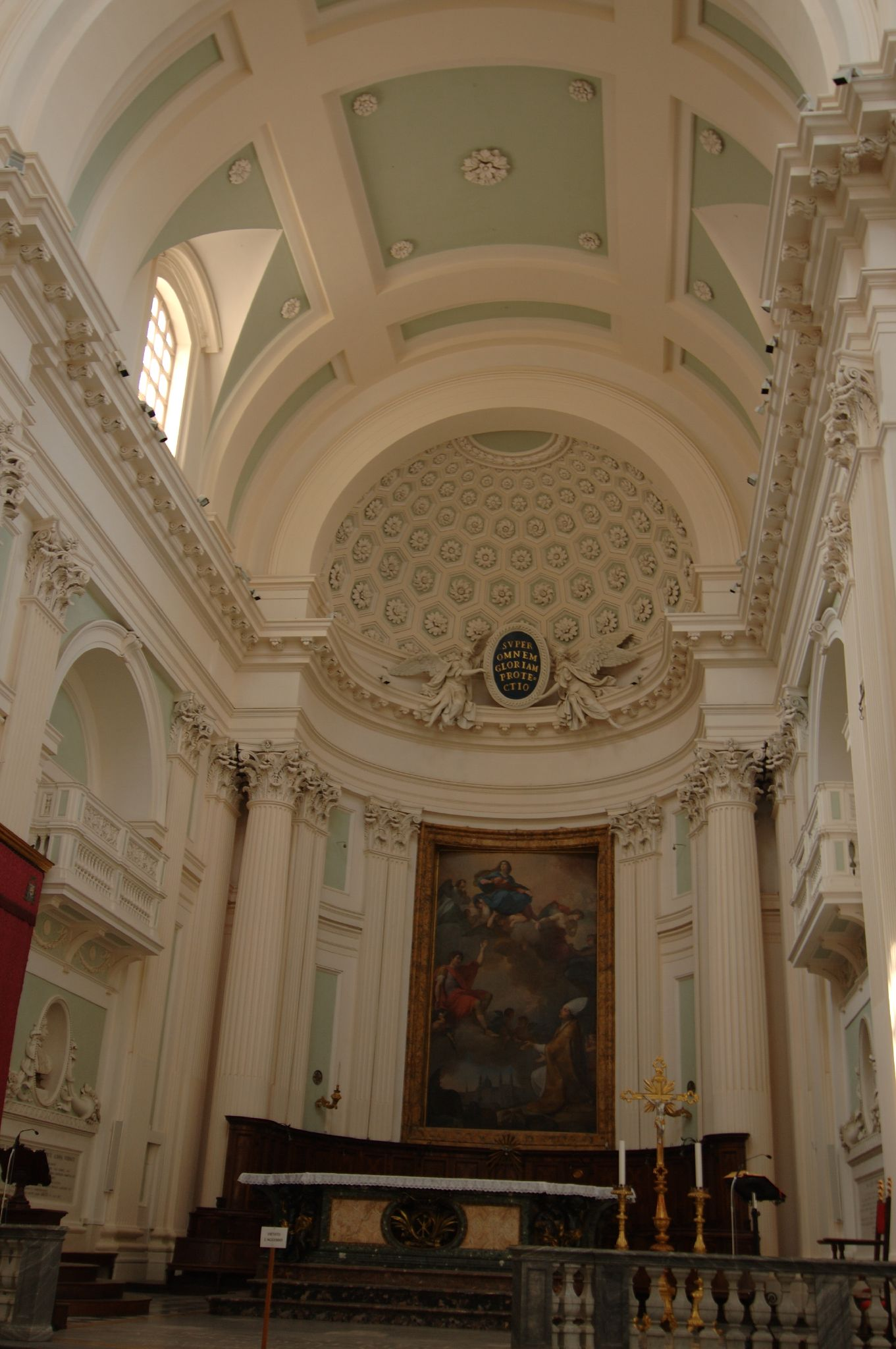
Apse interior

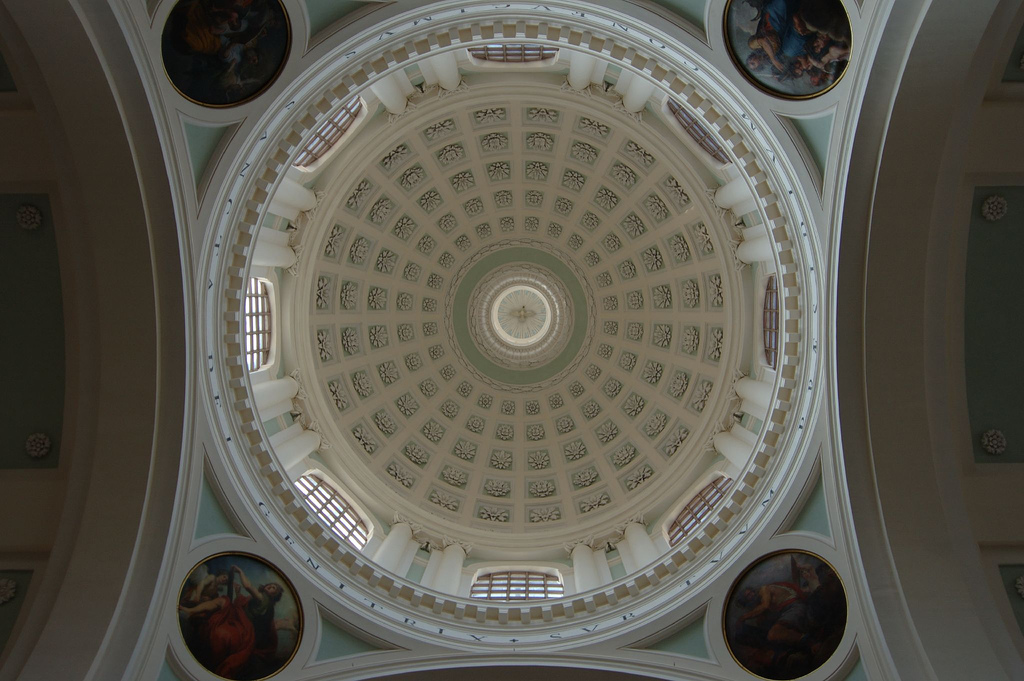
Cupola

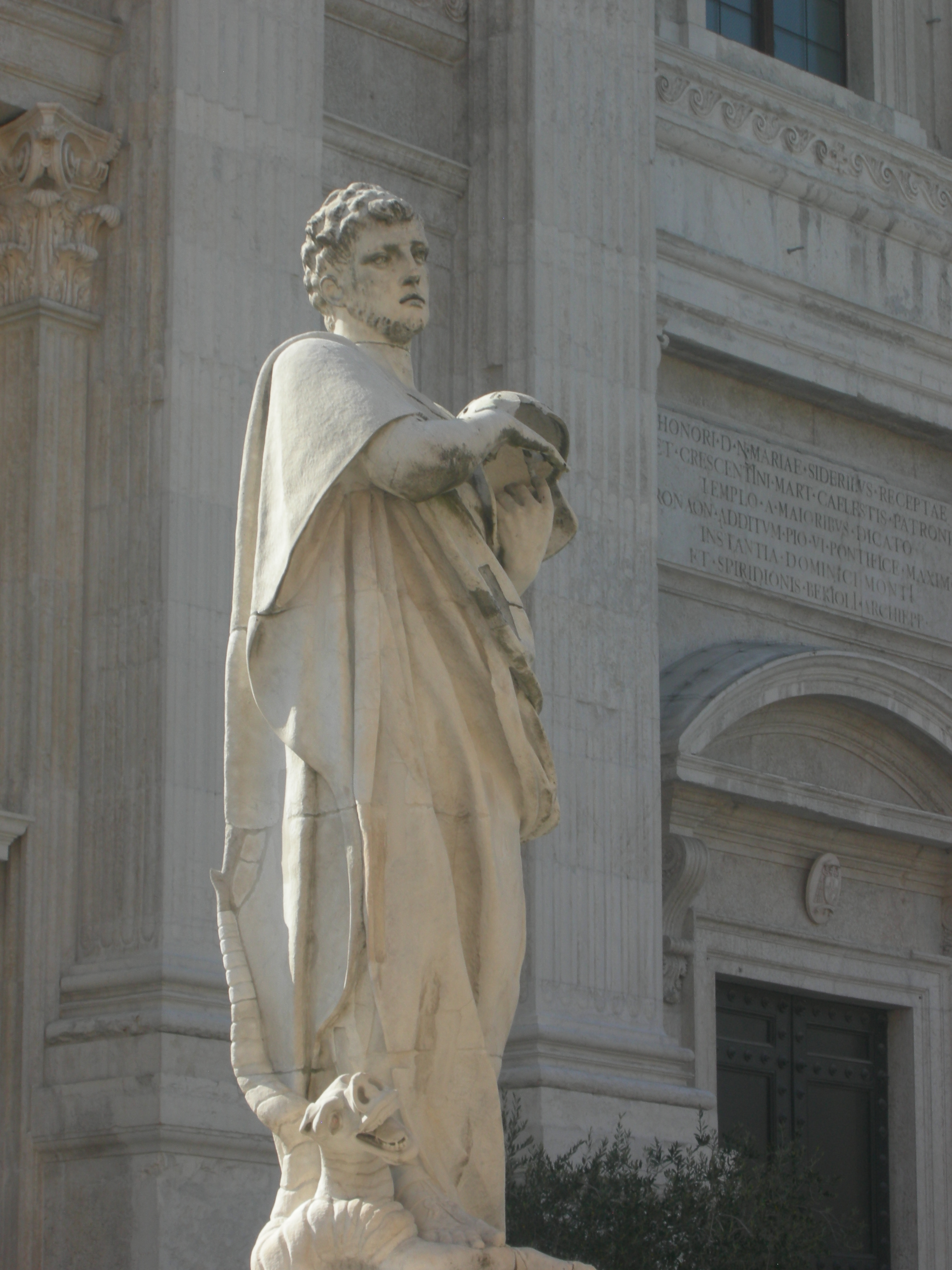
Statue of San Crescentino in front of the cathedral

== Sources ==
- Negroni, F., 1993: Il Duomo di Urbino. Urbino
