= Antonio Camillo Pesci =

Italian Catholic bishop (died 1521)

Most Reverend Antonio Camillo Pesci
- Bishop of Muro Lucano
- Church: Catholic Church
- Diocese: Diocese of Muro Lucano
- In office: 1517–1521
- Predecessor: Nicolò Antonio Pesci
- Successor: Cesare Carpano

Personal details
- Died: 1521 Muro Lucano, Italy

Antonio Camillo Pesci (died 1521) was a Roman Catholic prelate who served as Bishop of Muro Lucano (1517–1521).

== Biography ==
On 23 December 1517, Antonio Camillo Pesci was appointed during the papacy of Pope Leo X as Bishop of Muro Lucano. He served as Bishop of Muro Lucano until his death in 1521.

== External links and additional sources ==
- Cheney, David M. "Diocese of Muro Lucano". Catholic-Hierarchy.org. (for Chronology of Bishops) ^{[self-published]}
- Chow, Gabriel. "Diocese of Muro Lucano (Italy)". GCatholic.org. (for Chronology of Bishops) ^{[self-published]}

Catholic Church titles
Preceded by Nicolò Antonio Pesci	Bishop of Muro Lucano; 1517–1521	Succeeded by Cesare Carpano
