= Archdiocese of Urbino–Urbania–Sant'Angelo in Vado =

Latin Catholic ecclesiastical jurisdiction in Italy

Coordinates: 43.7252°N 12.6372°E

Archdiocese of Urbino–Urbania–Sant'Angelo in Vado Archidioecesis Urbinatensis–Urbaniensis–Sancti Angeli in Vado

Catholic
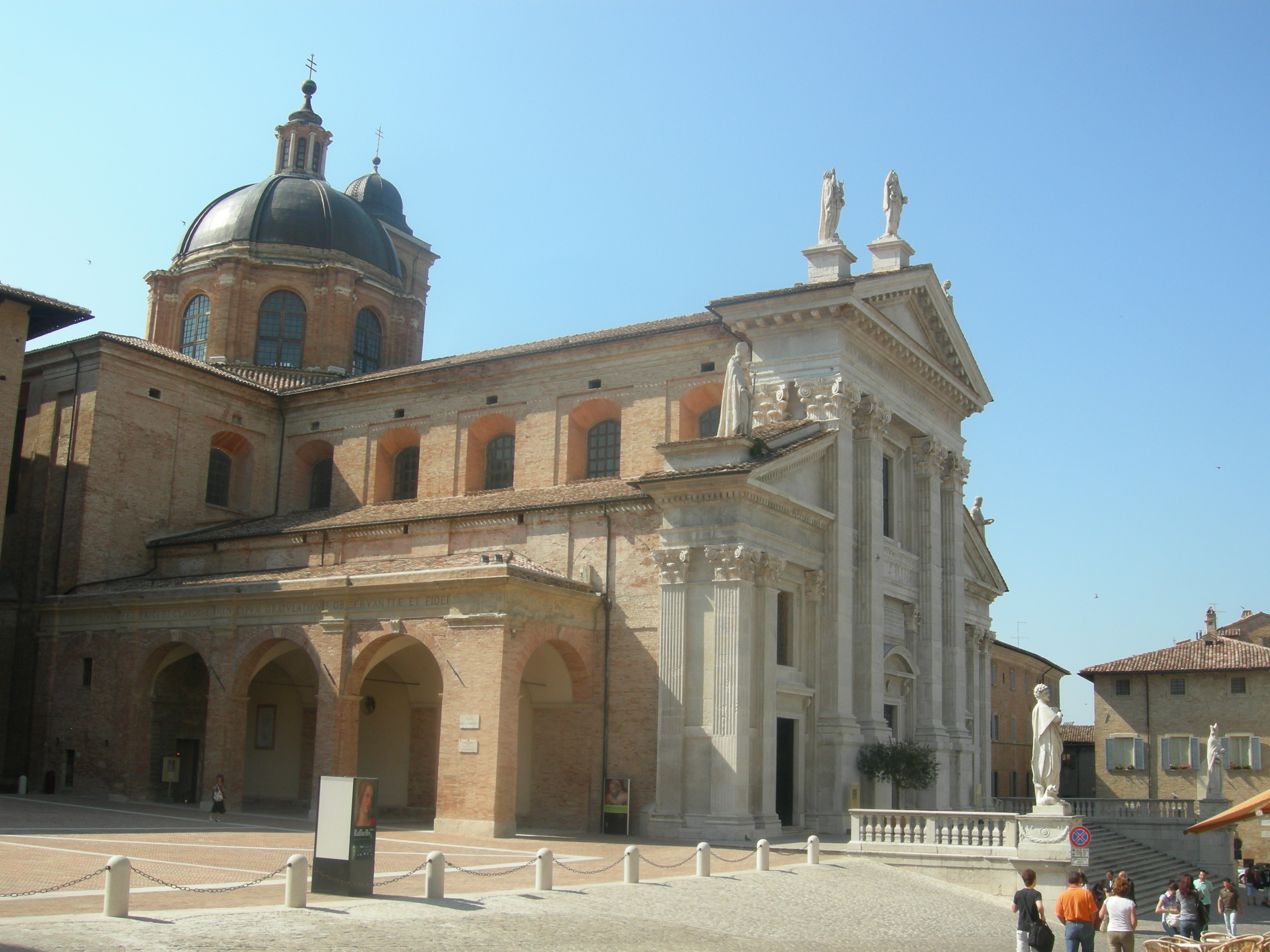
- Urbino Cathedral

Location
- Country: Italy
- Ecclesiastical province: Pesaro

Statistics
- Area: 781 km^{2} (302 sq mi)
- Population: Total; Catholics: (as of 2023); 55,094 ▼; 49,860 (est.) ▼ (90.5%)
- Parishes: 54

Information
- Denomination: Catholic Church
- Sui iuris church: Latin Church
- Rite: Roman Rite
- Established: 6th century
- Cathedral: Basilica Cattedrale di S. Maria Assunta (Urbino)
- Co-cathedral: Concattedrale di S. Cristoforo Martire (Urbania); Basilica Concattedrale di S. Michele Arcangelo (Sant'Angelo in Vado)
- Secular priests: 44 (diocesan) ▼10 (Religious Orders) ▼8 Permanent Deacons ▲

Current leadership
- Pope: Leo XIV
- Archbishop: Sandro Salvucci
- Bishops emeritus: Giovanni Tani

Map

Website
- Archdiocesan website (in Italian)

The Archdiocese of Urbino–Urbania–Sant'Angelo in Vado (Latin: Archidioecesis Urbinatensis–Urbaniensis–Sancti Angeli in Vado) is a Latin Church ecclesiastical territory or archdiocese of the Catholic Church in the Province of Pesaro and Urbino in the Marche region of central Italy. It was previously a metropolitan see.

Its cathedral is a minor basilica and World Heritage Site: Basilica Cattedrale di S. Maria Assunta, in Urbino. It has two co-cathedrals, both former cathedrals of absorbed diocese whose title was also adopted: another minor basilica, the Basilica Concattedrale di S. Michele Arcangelo, dedicated to the archangel Saint Michael, in Sant'Angelo in Vado, and the Concattedrale di S. Cristoforo Martire, dedicated to the protomartyr Saint Christopher, in Urbania.

The current archbishop is Sandro Salvucci, appointed in January 2023.

== History ==
Urbino is the ancient Urbinum Mataurense, a Roman municipium. Urbino was held by the Ostrogoths from the late 5th century, but was captured by Belisarius (538).

Under Pepin the Short, in 756, Urbino became part of the pontifical domain. In 773, Urbino, Montefeltro, Sinigaglia, Jesi, and Gubbio were attacked and captured by the Lombard king Desiderius. Pope Hadrian I appealed for Frankish intervention, and Charlemagne entered Italy, besieged Pavia, and deposed Desiderius. Charles himself became King of the Lombards, and confirmed the donations of Pepin, including Urbino, as did Louis the Pious.

Circa 590 it was established as Diocese of Urbino, on reassigned territory from the suppressed Diocese of Sant'Angelo in Vado.

=== Chapter and cathedral ===
The cathedral of Urbino is dedicated to the Assumption of the Virgin Mary's Body into Heaven and to S. Crescentino, the patron of the city, whose remains are preserved in the cathedral. The old cathedral was rebuilt by Bishop Mainardus, and consecrated in 1064. On 14 April 1672, a major earthquake, centered at Rimini, struck Umbria and the Marche; the cathedrals of Rimini and Fano were destroyed, and the cathedral of Urbino suffered cracks in its dome. On 24 April 1741, another earthquake damaged the cathedral and the convent of S. Francesco, the ducal palace, and the archepiscopal palace.

The cathedral is staffed and administered by an ecclesiastical body called the Chapter, which, in 1068 under Bishop Mainardus, consisted of one dignity, the Provost, and twelve canons. The dignities of Archdeacon, Archpriest and Dean were instituted by Pope Pius IV in 1563. In 1655, the Chapter consisted of four dignities (Provost, Archdeacon, Archpriest, Dean) and thirteen canons; in 1766, there were four dignities and fifteen canons.

=== Loss of territory 1401 ===
During the administration of Bishop Oddo Colonna, on 8 March 1401, Pope Boniface IX (Roman Obedience in the Western Schism) established the Abbacy nullius of San Cristoforo di Castel Durante. Territory to support the abbey was drawn from the diocese of Urbino, sufficiently extensive as to support a bishopric.

=== Metropolitan archdiocese ===
On 7 July 1563, with the papal bull "Super universas", Pope Pius IV promoted the diocese to the status of Metropolitan Archdiocese of Urbino. As Metropolitan, it was assigned six suffragan sees: Diocese of Cagli, Diocese of Sinigaglia, Diocese of Pesaro, diocese of Fossombrone, Diocese of Montefeltro and Diocese of Gubbio. In 1986, the diocese of S. Angelo in Vado and the Diocese of Pergola were suppressed and their territories added to the archdiocese of Urbino.

==== Synods ====
Bishop Felice Tiranni (1551–1578) held a provincial synod in Urbino in 1568.

A diocesan synod was an irregularly held, but important, meeting of the bishop of a diocese and his clergy. Its purpose was (1) to proclaim generally the various decrees already issued by the bishop; (2) to discuss and ratify measures on which the bishop chose to consult with his clergy; (3) to publish statutes and decrees of the diocesan synod, of the provincial synod, and of the Holy See.

Archbishop Felice Tiranni (1551–1578) presided over a diocesan synod in 1570. Archbishop Paolo Emilio Santorio (1623–1635) held a diocesan synod in 1628. On 8 June 1648, Archbishop Ascanio Maffei (1646–1659) presided over a diocesan synod. Cardinal Archbishop Antonio Francesco Sanvitale (1709–1714) held a diocesan synod in the cathedral on 9–11 May 1713. On 4–6 May 1734, Archbishop Giovanni Marelli (1716–1739) presided over a diocesan synod in the cathedral. Archbishop Antonio Guglielmi (1739–1766) held a diocesan synod in the cathedral of S. Maria Assunta on 13–15 June 1753. A diocesan synod was held by Archbishop Spiridione Berioli (1787–1819) on 2–4 September 1793.

On 20 October 1636, the diocese of Urbino lost territory when the decision was taken by Pope Urban VIII to establish the suffragan Diocese of Sant'Angelo in Vado.

Pope Clement XI (1700–1721), Francesco Albani, was a native of Urbino, and during his pontificate was generous in terms of honors and financial gifts to the diocese.

In 1885, the archdiocese of Urbino had 53,005 persons, with 196 churches and oratories.

=== Provincial and diocesan reorganization ===
The Second Vatican Council (1962–1965), in order to ensure that all Catholics received proper spiritual attention, decreed the reorganization of the diocesan structure of Italy and the consolidation of small and struggling dioceses. It also recommended the abolition of anomalous units such as exempt territorial prelatures.

On 18 February 1984, the Vatican and the Italian State signed a new and revised concordat. Based on the revisions, a set of Normae was issued on 15 November 1984, which was accompanied in the next year, on 3 June 1985, by enabling legislation. According to the agreement, the practice of having one bishop govern two separate dioceses at the same time, aeque personaliter, as was the case with Terni, Narni and Amelia, was to be discontinued. Instead, the Vatican continued consultations which had begun under Pope John XXIII for the merging of small dioceses, especially those with personnel and financial problems, into one combined diocese.

On 27 September 1986, Pope John Paul II approved a decree, which was published by the Congregation of Bishops on 30 September 1986. The dioceses of Urbino, Urbana, and S. Angelo in Vado, were united into one single diocese, which was named the Archdiocese of Urbino–Urbania–Sant’Angelo in Vado. The territories of the three dioceses were combined in one diocese. The cathedral of the diocese was to be in Urbino, while the cathedrals of the other two dioceses became co-cathedrals.

=== New metropolitan ===
On 11 March 2000, the new ecclesiastical province of Pesaro was established by Pope John Paul II. In terms of civil jurisdictions, the city of Pescara had become the capital of the Province of Pescara, a factor which had to be taken into consideration in the reorganization of Italian dioceses. The archdiocese of Urbino lost its status as metropolitan see, becoming part of the ecclesiastical province of the Metropolitan Archdiocese of Pesaro.

== Bishops of Urbino ==
Erected: 6th Century
Latin Name: Urbinatensis

=== to 1300 ===
[ Evandrus (313) ]

- Leontius (c. 593–596)
- Sebastianus (599)
- ? Exhilaratus (680)
- ? Temaurinus (769)
- Marianus (826)
- Constantinus (853)
- Petrus (861)
- Joannes (867)

[ Albertus (887) ]

- Ingizo (968)
- Theodoricus (1021 – death 1049)
- Teuzo (1050–?)
- Mainardus (1056 – death 1088)
- Petrus (1088–?)
- Guido (1145–?), died 1146
- Giso (1162 – death 1192)
- Ugo Brandi (1192 – death 1203)
- Vivio (1204 – death 1213)
- Ranieri (1214–?)
- Oddone (1220 – death 1242)
- Pietro (1242 – death 1258)
- Guido Brancaleoni (1259 – 1283)
- Egidio (1285 – 1309)

=== From 1300 to 1500 ===
- Giacomo (1309 – death 1317)
- Alessandro Guidi (1317 – death 1340)
- Marco Rognoni =? Marco Boncioni, (1342), theologian.
- Bartolomeo Carus (1347 – 1349), theologian.
- Francesco Brancaleoni (2 May 1350 – death 1370)
- Guglielmo da Urbino (1373 – 15 January 1379)
- Francesco Thomae, O.F.M. (1379)

○ Oddone Colonna (1380–1409), Bishop-elect

- Matthaeus Fiorilli (1409–1412)
- Georgius (1412–1418?)
- Matthaeus Fiorilli (1418–1422)
- Thomas Tomasini, O.P. (1423–1424)
- Giacomo Balardi Arrigoni, O.P. (1424–1435)
- Antonio Altan San Vito (10 Feb 1436 – 1450 Died)
- Latino Orsini (23 Dec 1450 – 11 Sep 1452 Resigned)
- Andrea Veroli (11 Sep 1452 – 26 May 1463 Appointed, Bishop of Muro Lucano)
- Girolamo Staccoli (29 May 1463 – 1468)
- Giovanni Battista Mellini (27 April 1468 – 24 Jul 1478 Died)
- Lazarus Racanelli (14 August 1478 – 1484 Died)
- Filippo Contorni (20 Sep 1484 – 16 April 1491 Died)
- Giampietro Arrivabene (1491–1504),

=== From 1500 to 1578 ===
- Gabriele de' Gabrielli (27 Mar 1504 – 5 Nov 1511 Died)
- Antonio Trombetta, O.F.M.Conv. (1511 – 1514 Resigned)

○ Cardinal Domenico Grimani (1514–1523), Administrator

- Giacomo Narducci (17 Jul 1523 – 14 Jan 1540 Died)
- Dionisio Laurerio (13 Feb 1540 – 17 Sep 1542 Died)
- Cardinal Gregorio Cortese, O.S.B. (1542 – 1548), Administrator

○ Cardinal Giulio della Rovere (1548 – 1551), Bishop-elect

- Felice Tiranni (18 Nov 1551 – 1 Feb 1578 Died), reformer of religious life.

== Archbishops of Urbino ==
Elevated: 7 July 1563

- Felice Tiranni (1563–1578)
- Antonio Giannotti da Montagnana (11 Aug 1578 – 1597)
- Giuseppe Ferrerio (1597 – 16 March 1610 Died)
- Benedetto Ala (5 May 1610 – 27 April 1620)
- Ottavio Accoramboni (17 May 1621 – 1623 Resigned)
- Paolo Emilio Santori (1623–1635)
- Antonio Santacroce (9 June 1636 – 1639 Resigned)
- Francesco Vitelli (16 Nov 1643 – Feb 1646)
- Ascanio Maffei (25 June 1646 – Oct 1659)
- Giacomo de Angelis (20 Sep 1660 – 1667 Resigned)
- Callisto Puccinelli, O.S.M. (16 March 1667 –1675)
- Giambattista Candiotti (1675–1684)
- Antonio Francesco Roberti (10 Sep 1685 – 26 Jan 1701 Died)

Sede vacante (1701–1709)

- Cardinal Antonio Francesco Sanvitale (1709–1714)
- Giovanni Tommaso Maria Marelli, Orat. (1716–1739)
- Antonio Guglielmi (1739 – 5 Feb 1766)
- Domenico Monti (14 April 1766 – 8 Sep 1787)
- Spiridione Berioli (17 Dec 1787 – 19 April 1819)
- Ignazio Ranaldi (1819–1827)
- Giangrisostomo Dondini (21 May 1827 – 10 Nov 1832)
- Giovanni Niccolò Tanara (1832–1845)
- Alessandro Angeloni (1846–1881)
- Antonio Maria Pettinari, O.F.M.Obs. (1881 – 27 July 1885 Resigned)
- Carlo Maria Borgognini (1886–1889)
- Nicodario Vampa (1889–1903)
- Giovanni Maria Giuseppe Santarelli, O.F.M. (1904 –1908)
- Ciro Pontecorvi (29 April 1909 – 26 June 1911)
- Giacomo Ghio (28 March 1912 – 20 Oct 1931 Resigned)
- Antonio Tani (1932–1952 Resigned)
- Anacleto Cazzaniga (12 Jan 1953 – 23 May 1977 Retired)
- Ugo Donato Bianchi (1977 – 1999)

== Archbishops of Urbino–Urbania–Sant'Angelo in Vado ==
30 September 1986 Urbania and Sant'Angelo suppressed, territory united with the Archdiocese of Urbino

- Francesco Marinelli (11 March 2000 – 24 June 2011 Retired)
- Giovanni Tani (24 June 2011 – 7 January 2023)
- Sandro Salvucci (24 January 2023 - )

== See also ==
- List of Catholic dioceses in Italy

== Sources ==
=== Reference works ===
- Eubel, Conradus, ed. (1913). Hierarchia catholica (in Latin). Vol. 1 (Tomus 1) (second ed.). Münster: Libreria Regensbergiana. p. 509.. Archived.
- Eubel, Conradus, ed. (1914). Hierarchia catholica (in Latin). Vol. 2 (Tomus 2) (second ed.). Münster: Libreria Regensbergiana. p. 260.. Archived.
- Eubel, Conradus, ed. (1923). Hierarchia catholica (in Latin). Vol. 3 (Tomus 3) (second ed.). Münster: Libreria Regensbergiana. p. 323.. Archived.
- Gams, Pius Bonifatius (1873). Series episcoporum Ecclesiae catholicae: quotquot innotuerunt a beato Petro apostolo (in Latin). Ratisbon: Typis et Sumptibus Georgii Josephi Manz. pp. 730–731.
- Gauchat, Patritius (Patrice) (1935). Hierarchia catholica IV (1592-1667) (in Latin). Münster: Libraria Regensbergiana. p. 252.
- Ritzler, Remigius; Sefrin, Pirminus (1952). Hierarchia catholica medii et recentis aevi. Vol. Tomus V (1667-1730). Patavii: Messagero di S. Antonio. p. 280.
- Ritzler, Remigius; Sefrin, Pirminus (1958). Hierarchia catholica medii et recentis aevi. Vol. Tomus VI (1730-1799). Patavii: Messagero di S. Antonio. p. 301.
- Ritzler, Remigius; Sefrin, Pirminus (1968). Hierarchia Catholica medii et recentioris aevi (in Latin). Vol. VII (1800–1846). Monasterii: Libreria Regensburgiana.
- Remigius Ritzler; Pirminus Sefrin (1978). Hierarchia catholica Medii et recentioris aevi (in Latin). Vol. VIII (1846–1903). Il Messaggero di S. Antonio.
- Pięta, Zenon (2002). Hierarchia catholica medii et recentioris aevi (in Latin). Vol. IX (1903–1922). Padua: Messagero di San Antonio. ISBN 978-88-250-1000-8.

=== Studies ===
- Cappelletti, Giuseppe (1845). Le chiese d'Italia (in Italian). Vol. terzo (3). Venice: G. Antonelli. pp. 165–233.
- Kehr, Paul Fridolin (1909). Italia pontificia. (in Latin). Vol. IV. Berlin: Weidmann 1909. pp. 218-221.
- Lanzoni, Francesco (1923). Le diocesi d'Italia dalle origini al principio del secolo VII (an. 604). (in Italian). Faenza: F. Lega.
- Lazzari, Andrea (1795). Memorie istoriche dei conti, e duchi di Urbino, delle donazioni, investiture e della devoluzione alla santa sede... (in Italian and Latin). Fermo: Dai Torchi camerali di Pallade. Pp. 341-427.
- Schwartz, Gerhard (1913), Die Besetzung der Bistümer Reichsitaliens unter den sächsischen und salischen Kaisern : mit den Listen der Bischöfe, 951-1122, Leipzig-Berlin 1913, pp. 254-255. (in German)
- Ughelli, Ferdinando; Coleti, Niccolò (1717). Italia sacra sive De Episcopis Italiae, et insularum adjacentium (in Latin). Vol. 2. Venice: apud Sebastianum Coleti. pp. 779–808.
