= Flavio Orsini =

Italian bishop and cardinal (1532–1581)

Flavio Orsini (1532 – 16 May 1581) was a papal bureaucrat, an Italian bishop, and a cardinal of the Catholic Church. He was son of Ferdinando Orsini, 5th duke of Gravina; and Beatrice Ferrillo, daughter and heiress of Giovanni Alfonso Ferrillo, Conte di Muro Lucano.

== Biography ==
Born in Rome, he was appointed bishop of Muro Lucano by Pope Pius IV (Medici) in consistory on 29 November 1560.

He held various offices in the Roman Curia. On 10 July 1561, Flavio Orsini, Bishop of Muro and Auditor of Causes in the Apostolic Camera, transmitted a motu proprio of Pope Pius IV granting a feudal investiture to Baldassare Rangoni of Modena. On 3 September 1563, the Bishop of Muro was judge ordinary in the curia, hearing a testamentary dispute from the diocese of Ajaccio.

He was transferred to the diocese of Spoleto on 16 December 1562 by Pope Pius IV.

In his fourth consistory for the creation of cardinals, on 12 March 1565, Pope Pius IV named Flavio Orsini a cardinal-priest, and on 15 May assigned him the titulus of San Giovanni a Porta Latina. On 17 November 1565, he chose to be moved to ("opted for") SS. Marcellino e Pietro, and on 9 July 1578 to Santa Prisca.

On 19 September 1570, Pope Pius V (Ghislieri) appointed a commission of two cardinals, Giovanni Poliziani and Flavio Orsini, to complete the repairs on the Aqua Vergine and connect various fountains, including the Trevi.

Pope Gregory XIII (Boncompagni) sent Bishop Orsini to France in 1572, to attempt to persuade King Charles IX of France to join in a crusade against the Turks. He arrived in Paris on October 8, and was still in France in the second half of December. His mission was a failure.

On 11 April 1580, he was granted a coadjutor bishop with the right of succession, in the person of his nephew Pietro.

Flavio Orsini died in Pozzuoli, near Naples, on 16 May 1581.

== Books ==
- Eubel, Conradus; Gulik, Guilelmus (1923). Hierarchia catholica (in Latin). Vol. 3 (second ed.). Münster: Libreria Regensbergiana.
- Cardella, Lorenzo (1793). Memorie storiche de' cardinali della santa Romana chiesa. (in Italian) Tomo quinto (5). Roma: Pagliarini. pp. 94-95.
- Crescimbeni, Giovanni Mario (1716). L' Istoria della Chiesa di S. Giovanni avanti Porta Latina (in Italian) Roma: Antonio de'Rossi. pp. 384–385.
- Martuscelli, Luigi (1896). Numistrone e Muro-Lucano: Note appunti e ricordi storici. (in Italian). Napoli: R. Pesole. pp. 263–265.
- Sarnelli, Pompeo (1716). Lettere ecclesiastiche di monsignor Pompeo Sarnelli dottor della sacra teologia, e delle leggi, protonotario apostolico, abate di sant'Omobuono in Cesena (in Italian). Venezia: Antonio Bortoli. p. 189.
