= Diocese of Muro Lucano =

The Latin Catholic Diocese of Muro Lucano, in the southern Italian region of Basilicata, existed until 1986. In that year it was united into the archdiocese of Potenza-Muro Lucano-Marsico Nuovo.

== History ==
Pope Leo IX (1049–1054), in naming the diocese of Conza a metropolitan archdiocese, confirmed that its suffragan dioceses were: Muro Lucano, Satriano, Monteverde, Lacedonia, S. Angelo de'Lombardi and Bisaccia.

The first Bishop of Muro Lucano of whom there is mention was Leo (1049). He was one of fifty-five bishops present in Rome on 2 May 1050, at the second Roman synod of Pope Leo IX.

On 5 June 1212, Pope Innocent III appointed a bishop of Muro Lucano, Monteguidonis, to carry out the deposition of the Bishop of Melfi.

In 1248, a scandal developed in the diocese of Muro. When the previous bishop had died, the Archpriest and the Chapter of the cathedral of Muro elected Palermus, one of the canons, as the new bishop. This was done before the interdict was imposed on the Kingdom of Sicily in Spring 1248, and it canonically and by general agreement. But, following a mandate of the Emperor Frederick, who did not die until 13 December 1250, a Tarentine cleric named Nicholas de Patrice intruded himself and had himself consecrated bishop. The bishop-elect Palermus would have had an appeal to the archbishop of Conza, who was the metropolitan of the ecclesiastical province, but the post was vacant at the time. He therefore appealed directly to the pope. Pope Innocent, on 12 June 1253, addressed the situation in a letter to the archbishop of Trani, ordering him to investigate the election, and if he found it canonical, and Palermus to be suitable, he should confirm the election with papal authority and consecrate Palermus. Otherwise, the election was to be voided. Nicholas was to be removed.

Bishop Antonio of Mura (1376–1386) became a partisan of the Pope Clement VII of the Avignon obedience; he was therefore driven to seek refuge at Polsino by Charles III of Naples, who supported Pope Urban VI of the Roman Obedience in exchange for the pope's receiving his oath of fealty for Naples and Sicily. Pope Clement VII created the diocese of Bolsino or Polsino (called Buccino by D'Avino) for him, since the diocese of Muro, under the influence of king Charles III of Naples, had declared for Urban VI (Roman Obedience). Antonius was transferred there on 1 July 1386. He died shortly thereafter.

On 27 July 1382, in the castle of Muro Lucano, on the orders of Charles III of Naples, the deposed and imprisoned Queen Joanna of Anjou was suffocated to death with pillows.

One bishop of Muro was the poet Gian Carlo Coppola (1643), who later became Bishop of Gallipoli, his native town; another, Alfonso Pacello (1674), was the founder of a congregation of priests for the care of the sick of the diocese. The see was suffragan of the archdiocese of Conza.

Bishop Giovanni Carlo Coppola (1643–1652) summoned a diocesan synod in 1645. Bishop Domenico Antonio Manfredi (1724–1738) held a diocesan synod at Muro Lucano on 1–3 April 1728. Bishop Vito Moio (1744–1767) presided at the tenth diocesan synod at Muro Lucano on 15 August 1746. Bishop Tommaso Antonio Gigli, O.F.M. Conv. (1832–1858), held a diocesan synod in 1841.

=== Chapter and cathedral ===
The oldest cathedral was built on the citadel, immediately adjacent to the castle. Bishop Manfredi noted the existence of an inscription found on a stone which had been used in a step of the old high altar of the cathedral; it carried the date, in Roman numerals, 1009. From this report, he inferred that the cathedral was already in existence in 1009 or 1013. Marturelli is not sure of the inevitability of the deduction, and suggests that the building may have been older. Nor is it inevitable that the bishopric, the cathedral, and the Chapter were of the same exact date.

The original Chapter was composed of eleven persons: the five dignities (the Archdeacon, the Archpriest, the Primicerius, the Cantor, and the Treasurer) and six Canons. All the other priests of the city of Muro Lucano were "Capitularii"; they shared in the income of the cathedral, but did not enjoy the privileges of Canons. On 29 November 1566, Bishop Filesio Cittadini suppressed two of the positions capitulary priests and converted them into canonries; on 18 October 1606, Bishop Tommaso Confetti (1606–1630), in accordance with the decrees of the Council of Trent, promoted two canons into dignities, the Canon Theological (the cathedral preacher) and the Canon Penitentiary. On 26 August 1645, Bishop Giancarlo Coppola reformed the system, and reduced the number of those enjoying income from the cathedral income to twenty-four. On 14 December 1676, Bishop Alfonso Pacelli converted two of the portionarii into canons; there were then to be five dignities, twelve canons, and seven portionarii. Bishop Manfredo laid out in great detail the privileges and duties of each of the dignities and canons in an appendix to the Synodical Decrees on 1724.

A modern cathedral building, dedicated to the Assumption of the Virgin Mary, but now only a co-cathedral in the archdiocese of Potenza-Muro Lucano-Marsico Nuovo, was consecrated on 29 November 1888, by Bishop Raffaele Capone and Bishop Alfonso Maria Giordano of Teano e Calvi. On 23 November 1980, a severe earthquake destroyed the cathedral, the episcopal palace, the church of the Carmine, the church of the convent of the Capucines, and many other buildings in Muro Lucano.

=== Seminary ===
The Council of Trent, in its 23rd session in 1562, decreed that each diocese, to the extent that it was feasible, should have a diocesan seminary for the training of priests. Bishop Filesio Cittadini (1562–1571) began raising funds for a new seminary in Muro, first, with a decree of 27 September 1565, establishing the project; and second, with the imposition of a tax on all ecclesiastical benefices of whatever sort to endow the institution. On 27 April 1568, he assigned to the seminary the benefices of S. Elia and Santa Croce, followed by those of S. Maria dell'Incoronata, S. Paolo, and S. Domenica. He added a tax of 25% of the income of S. Giovanni delle Monache and of S. Pietro in Aquilone. On 27 June 1675, Bishop Alfonso Pacella (1674–1702) added the benefices of S. Tommaso a Cerrutoli and S. Potito, and Bishop Domenico Antonio Manfredi (1724–1738) added four more. These provided salaries for priest-teachers and for the needs of the students.

In his synod of 1728, Bishop Domenico Antonio Manfredi reported that the seminary had been founded next to the episcopal palace, in a building with a central courtyard, a chapel (which had been donated by Princess Giovanna Tolfa Frangipani, the mother of Pope Benedict XIII), two dormitories (downstairs, and upstairs), a dining room, a common room, a kitchen and pantries, a cantina, a garden, and two rooms in which ordinands could carry out their spiritual exercises. The institution had a Rector, a Vice-Rector, and a Master of the school. There were instructors in grammar, philosophy, theology, rhetoric, civil and canon law, gregorian chant, church accounting,

Under Bishop Tommaso Antonio Gigli (1832–1858), additional rooms were added to the seminary building in 1841 to accommodate the increasing number of students. During the revolution of 1860, however, the seminary had to be closed.

=== The Napoleonic disruption and restoration ===
From 1806 to 1808, Naples was occupied by the French, and Joseph Bonaparte was made king, after Napoleon had deposed King Ferdinand IV. Joseph Bonaparte was succeeded by Joachim Murat, from 1808 until the fall of Napoleon in 1815. Pope Pius VII was a prisoner of Napoleon in France from 1809 to 1815, and was both unable and unwilling to make new episcopal appointments. The French expelled all members of the mendicant orders, friars and nuns, and their property was confiscated for the "benefit of the people". The Jesuits were expelled from the kingdom; colleges of canons were also disbanded and their property seized.

Following the extinction of the Napoleonic Kingdom of Italy, the Congress of Vienna authorized the restoration of the Papal States and the Kingdom of Naples. Since the French occupation had seen the abolition of many Church institutions in the Kingdom, as well as the confiscation of most Church property and resources, it was imperative that Pope Pius VII and King Ferdinand IV reach agreement on restoration and restitution. Ferdinand, however, was not prepared to accept the pre-Napoleonic situation, in which Naples was a feudal subject of the papacy. Neither was he prepared to accept the large number of small dioceses in his kingdom; following French intentions, he demanded the suppression of fifty dioceses. Lengthy, detailed, and acrimonious negotiations ensued. On 17 July 1816, King Ferdinand issued a decree, in which he forbade the reception of any papal document without prior reception of the royal exequatur. This meant that prelates could not receive bulls of appointment, consecration, or installation without the king's permission.

A concordat was finally signed on 16 February 1818, and ratified by Pius VII on 25 February 1818. Ferdinand issued the concordat as a law on 21 March 1818. The re-erection of the dioceses of the kingdom and the ecclesiastical provinces took more than three years. The right of the king to nominate the candidate for a vacant bishopric was recognized, as in the Concordat of 1741, subject to papal confirmation (preconisation). On 27 June 1818, Pius VII issued the bull De Ulteriore, in which the metropolitan church of Conza was reconstituted. It was to have as suffragans the dioceses of S. Angelo dei Lombardi, Laquedonia, and Muro Lucano.

=== Post-Vatican-II changes ===
Following the Second Vatican Council, and in accordance with the norms laid out in the council's decree, Christus Dominus chapter 40, Pope Paul VI ordered a reorganization of the ecclesiastical provinces in southern Italy. The decree "Eo quod spirituales" of 12 September 1976 created a new episcopal conference in the region called "Basilicata", to which were assigned all of the dioceses that belonged to the ecclesiastical province of Potenza, including Materana and Mons Pelusii; they had formerly belonged to the episcopal conference of "Apulia". Pope Paul VI ordered consultations among the members of the Congregation of Bishops in the Vatican Curia, the Italian Bishops Conference, and the various dioceses concerned. After twenty years, problems and objections were still apparent.

On 18 February 1984, the Vatican and the Italian State signed a new and revised concordat. Based on the revisions, a set of Normae was issued on 15 November 1984, which was accompanied in the next year, on 3 June 1985, by enabling legislation. According to the agreement, the practice of having one bishop govern two separate dioceses at the same time, aeque personaliter, was abolished. The Vatican continued consultations which had begun under Pope John XXIII for the merging of small dioceses, especially those with personnel and financial problems, into one combined diocese.

On 30 September 1986, Pope John Paul II ordered that the dioceses of Potenza, Marsico Nuovo, and Muro Lucano be merged into one diocese with one bishop, with the Latin title Archidioecesis Potentina-Murana-Marsicensis. The seat of the diocese was to be in Potenza, and the cathedral of Potenza was to serve as the cathedral of the merged diocese. The cathedrals in Marsico Nuovo and Muro Lucano were to become co-cathedrals, and their cathedral Chapters were each to be a Capitulum Concathedralis. There was to be only one diocesan Tribunal, in Potenza, and likewise one seminary, one College of Consultors, and one Priests' Council. The territory of the new diocese was to include the territory of the suppressed dioceses of Marsico Nuovo and Muro Lucano.

== Bishops of Muro Lucano ==
Erected: 11th Century
Latin Name: Muranus

=== to 1400 ===
- Leo (attested 1050)
- Eustachius (attested 1059?)

...

- Gaudinus (attested 1101–1105)

...

- Robertus (attested 1169)

...

- Monteguidonis (attested 1212–1213)
- Joannes (attested 1217)

...

- Robertus (attested 1239)

...

- Nicolaus de Patricio (attested 1250–1253)
- Palermus (1253–1274)

...

- Nicolaus (attested 1322)
- Petrus ( ? –1332)
- Matthaeus (1332– ? )
- Nicolaus, O.Min. (attested 1340?–1344)
- Enrico Marci (1344–1348)
- Guglielmo (1348–1357)
- Giacomo del Fosco (1357–1364)
- Domenico Johannis, O. Carm. (1364–1373) Avignon Obedience
- Simon (1373– ? )
- Antonio (1376–1386) Avignon Obedience
- Guglielmo (1395–1405) Roman Obedience

=== 1400 to 1600 ===
- Giovanni Bonifacio Panella (1407–1417) Roman Obedience
- Guiduccio della Porta (1418–1423 Died)
- Giovanni Sanfelice (1423–1443 Resigned)
- Barnaba de Molina (1443–1462 Died)
- Andrea Veroli (1463–1464)
- Meolo de Mascabruni (1464–1486)
- Nicolò Antonio Pesci (Piscibus) (1486–1517 Resigned)
- Antonio Camillo Pesci (1517–1521 Died)
- Cesare Carpano (1521–1528 Died)
- Matteo Griffoni Pioppi, O.S.B. (1528–1540 Appointed, Bishop of Trivento)
- Ascanio Parisani (1540–1541 Resigned)
- Silverio Petrucci (1541–1560 Died)
- Flavio Orsini (1560–1562 Resigned)
- Filesio Cittadini (1562–1571 Resigned)
- Giulio Ricci (1572–1575 Appointed, Bishop of Gravina)
- Daniel Vocatius, O.F.M. (1575–1577 Died)
- Vincenzo Petrolini (1577–1606 Died)

Vincenzo Correrio Malatesta da Cammerota (1595–1605) Coadjutor

=== 1600 to 1800 ===
- Tommaso Confetti (1606–1630 Died)
- Clemente Confetti (Confetto) (1630–1643 Appointed, Bishop of Acerno)
- Giovanni Carlo Coppola (1643–1652 Died)
- Ascanio Ugolini (1652–660 Died)
- Francesco Maria Annoni, C.R. (1660–1674 Died)
- Alfonso Pacelli (Pacelli) (1674–1702 Died)
- Andrea Sarnelli (1703–1707 Died)
- Giovanni Innocenzo Carussio (1707–1718 Died)
- Angelo Acerno (1718–1724 Died)
- Domenico Antonio Manfredi (1724–1738)
- Melchiorre Delfico (1738–1744 Died)
- Vito Moio (Mojo) (1744–1767)
- Carlo Gagliardi (1767–1778)
- Luca Nicola de Luca (1778–1792)
- Giuseppe Maria Beneventi, O.F.M. Conv. (1792–1794)

Sede vacante (1794–1797)

- Giovanni Filippo Ferrone (1797–1826)

=== 1800 to 1986 ===
- Filippo Martuscelli (1827–1831)
- Tommaso Antonio Gigli, O.F.M. Conv. (1832–1858 Resigned)
- Francesco Saverio d'Ambrosio, O.F.M. Cap. (1859–1883)
- Raffaele Capone, C.SS.R. (1883–1908)
- Alessio Ascalesi, C.Pp.S. (1909–1911 Appointed, Bishop of Sant’Agata de' Goti)
- Giuseppe Scarlata (1911–1935 Died)
- Bartolomeo Mangino (1936–1946 Appointed, Bishop of Caserta)
- Giacomo Palombella (1946–1951 Appointed, Bishop of Calvi e Teano)
- Matteo Guido Sperandeo (1952–1954 Appointed, Bishop of Calvi e Teano)
- Antonio Rosario Mennonna (1955–1962 Appointed, Bishop of Nardò)
- Umberto Luciano Altomare (1962–1970 Appointed, Bishop of Diano-Teggiano)
- Aureliano Sorrentino (1973–1977 Appointed, Archbishop of Reggio Calabria)
- Giuseppe Vairo (1977–1986)

== See also ==
- Muro Lucano
- Roman Catholic Diocese of Marsico Nuovo

== Books ==
- Eubel, Conradus, ed. (1913). Hierarchia catholica (in Latin). Vol. Tomus 1 (second ed.). Münster: Libreria Regensbergiana.
- Eubel, Conradus, ed. (1914). Hierarchia catholica (in Latin). Vol. Tomus 2 (second ed.). Münster: Libreria Regensbergiana.
- Eubel, Conradus; Gulik, Guilelmus (1923). Hierarchia catholica (in Latin). Vol. 3 (second ed.). Münster: Libreria Regensbergiana.
- Gams, Pius Bonifatius (1873). Series episcoporum Ecclesiae catholicae: quotquot innotuerunt a beato Petro apostolo (in Latin). Ratisbon: Typis et Sumptibus Georgii Josephi Manz.
- Gauchat, Patritius (Patrice) (1935). Hierarchia catholica (in Latin). Vol. IV (1592-1667). Münster: Libraria Regensbergiana.
- Ritzler, Remigius; Sefrin, Pirminus (1952). Hierarchia catholica medii et recentis aevi (in Latin). Vol. V (1667-1730). Patavii: Messagero di S. Antonio.
- Ritzler, Remigius; Sefrin, Pirminus (1958). Hierarchia catholica medii et recentis aevi (in Latin). Vol. VI (1730-1799). Patavii: Messagero di S. Antonio.
- Ritzler, Remigius; Sefrin, Pirminus (1968). Hierarchia Catholica medii et recentioris aevi sive summorum pontificum, S. R. E. cardinalium, ecclesiarum antistitum series... A pontificatu Pii PP. VII (1800) usque ad pontificatum Gregorii PP. XVI (1846) (in Latin). Vol. VII. Monasterii: Libr. Regensburgiana.
- Remigius Ritzler; Pirminus Sefrin (1978). Hierarchia catholica Medii et recentioris aevi... A Pontificatu PII PP. IX (1846) usque ad Pontificatum Leonis PP. XIII (1903) (in Latin). Vol. VIII. Il Messaggero di S. Antonio.
- Pięta, Zenon (2002). Hierarchia catholica medii et recentioris aevi... A pontificatu Pii PP. X (1903) usque ad pontificatum Benedictii PP. XV (1922) (in Latin). Vol. IX. Padua: Messagero di San Antonio. ISBN 978-88-250-1000-8.

=== Studies ===
- Cappelletti, Giuseppe (1870). Le chiese d'Italia: dalla loro origine sino ai nostri giorni (in Italian). Vol. vigesimo (20). Venezia: G. Antonelli. pp. 571–576.
- D'Avino, Vincenzio (1848). Cenni storici sulle chiese arcivescovili, vescovili, e prelatizie (nullius) del regno delle due Sicilie (in Italian). Naples: dalle stampe di Ranucci. pp. 417–421.
- Kamp, Norbert (1975). Kirche und Monarchie im staufischen Königreich Sizilien. I. Prosopographische Grundlegung: 2. Apulien und Kalabrien. München: Wilhelm Fink Verlag. (in German) pp. 760–763.
- Kehr, Paul Fridolin (1962). Italia pontificia. Vol. IX: Samnium — Apulia — Lucania. Berlin: Weidmann. (in Latin) pp. 516–517.
- Martuscelli, Luigi (1896). Numistrone e Muro-Lucano: Note appunti e ricordi storici. (in Italian) Napoli: R. Pesole. [annotated list of bishops: pp. 239–319]
- Torelli, Felice (1848). La chiave del Concordato dell'anno 1818 e degli atti emanati posteriormente al medesimo. (in Italian) Volume 1, second edition Naples: Stamperia del Fibreno, 1848.
- Ughelli, Ferdinando; Coleti, NIccolo (1720). Italia sacra sive De episcopis Italiæ, et insularum adjacentium (in Latin). Vol. Tomus sextus (6). Venice: apud Sebastianum Coleti. pp. 843–852.
