= Onorato Onorati =

Italian Roman Catholic prelate

Most Reverend Onorato Onorati
- Bishop of Urbania e Sant'Angelo in Vado
- Church: Catholic Church
- Diocese: Diocese of Urbania and Sant'Angelo in Vado
- In office: 1636–1683
- Predecessor: None
- Successor: Horatius Ondedei

Orders
- Consecration: 28 September 1636 by Giulio Cesare Sacchetti

Onorato Onorati was a Roman Catholic prelate who served as the first Bishop of Urbania e Sant'Angelo in Vado (1636–1683).

== Biography ==
On 22 September 1636, Onorato Onorati was appointed during the papacy of Pope Urban VIII as Bishop of Urbania e Sant'Angelo in Vado. On 28 September 1636, he was consecrated bishop by Giulio Cesare Sacchetti, Cardinal-Priest of Santa Susanna, with Pietro Antonio Spinelli, Archbishop of Rossano, and Alexandre della Stufa, Bishop of Montepulciano, serving as co-consecrators. He served as Bishop of Urbania e Sant'Angelo in Vado until his resignation in August 1683.

== Episcopal succession ==
While bishop, he was the principal co-consecrator of:

- Gerolamo Pellegrini, Bishop of Melfi e Rapolla (1645);
- Niccolò Albergati-Ludovisi, Archbishop of Bologna (1645);
- Camillo Baldi, Bishop of Nicotera (1645);
- Domenico Cennini, Bishop of Gravina di Puglia (1645);
- Francisco Suárez de Villegas, Titular Bishop of Memphis (1649);
- Giovanni Mastelloni, Bishop of Vieste (1654);
- Pietro Frescobaldi, Bishop of San Miniato (1654); and
- Paolo Squillanti, Bishop of Teano (1654).

Catholic Church titles
Preceded by None	Bishop of Urbania e Sant'Angelo in Vado; 1636–1683	Succeeded by Horatius Ondedei
