= Alfonso Laso Sedeño =

Spanish Roman Catholic prelate (died 1607)

Most Reverend Alfonso Laso Sedeño
- Archbishop (Personal Title) of Mallorca
- Church: Catholic Church
- Diocese: Diocese of Majorca
- In office: 1604–1607
- Predecessor: Juan Vich Manrique de Lara
- Successor: Simón Vicente Bauzá
- Previous posts: Bishop of Gaeta (1587–1596); Archbishop of Cagliari (1596–1604)

Orders
- Consecration: 7 February 1588 by Enrico Caetani

Personal details
- Died: 21 August 1607 Mallorca, Spain

Alfonso Laso Sedeño (died 1607) was a Roman Catholic prelate who served as Archbishop (Personal Title) of Mallorca (1604–1607), Archbishop of Cagliari (1596–1604), and Bishop of Gaeta (1587–1596).

== Biography ==
On 12 October 1587, Alfonso Laso Sedeño was appointed during the papacy of Pope Sixtus V as Bishop of Gaeta. On 7 February 1588, he was consecrated bishop by Enrico Caetani, Cardinal-Priest of Santa Pudenziana, with José Esteve Juan, Bishop of Vieste, and Cristóbal Senmanat y Robuster, Bishop of Orihuela, serving as co-consecrators. On 7 February 1596, he was appointed during the papacy of Pope Clement VIII as Archbishop of Cagliari. On 1 December 1604, he was appointed during the papacy of Pope Clement VIII as Archbishop (Personal Title) of Mallorca. He served as Archbishop of Mallorca until his death on 21 August 1607.

== Episcopal succession ==
While bishop, he was the principal consecrator of:

- Francisco Esquivel, Archbishop of Cagliari (1605);

and the principal co-consecrator of:

- Carlos Muñoz Serrano, Bishop of Barbastro (1596).

== Sources ==
- Mattei, Antonio Felice (1758). Sardinia sacra seu De episcopis Sardis historia nunc primò confecta a F. Antonio Felice Matthaejo. (in Latin). Romae: ex typographia Joannis Zempel apud Montem Jordanum, 1758. Pp. 105-107.

=== External links ===
- Cheney, David M. "Archdiocese of Gaeta". Catholic-Hierarchy.org. (for Chronology of Bishops) ^{[self-published]}
- Chow, Gabriel. "Archdiocese of Gaeta (Italy)". GCatholic.org. (for Chronology of Bishops) ^{[self-published]}
- Cheney, David M. "Archdiocese of Cagliari". Catholic-Hierarchy.org. (for Chronology of Bishops) ^{[self-published]}
- Chow, Gabriel. "Metropolitan Archdiocese of Cagliari (Italy)". GCatholic.org. (for Chronology of Bishops) ^{[self-published]}
- Cheney, David M. "Diocese of Mallorca". Catholic-Hierarchy.org. (for Chronology of Bishops) ^{[self-published]}
- Chow, Gabriel. "Diocese of Mallorca (Spain)". GCatholic.org. (for Chronology of Bishops) ^{[self-published]}

Catholic Church titles
Preceded by Pietro Lunello	Bishop of Gaeta; 1587–1596	Succeeded by Giovanni de Gantes
Preceded by Francisco de Val	Archbishop of Cagliari; 1596–1604	Succeeded by Francisco Esquivel
Preceded by Juan Vich Manrique de Lara	Archbishop (Personal Title) of Mallorca; 1604–1607	Succeeded by Simón Vicente Bauzá
