= Domenico Cennini =

Italian Roman Catholic prelate

Most Reverend Domenico Cennini
- Bishop of Gravina di Puglia
- Church: Catholic Church
- Diocese: Diocese of Gravina di Puglia
- In office: 1645–1684
- Predecessor: Filippo Cansacchi
- Successor: Domenico Valvassori

Orders
- Ordination: November 1644
- Consecration: 19 March 1645 by Giulio Cesare Sacchetti

Personal details
- Born: 1606 Chiusi, Italy
- Died: August 1684 (age 78) Gravina di Puglia, Italy

Domenico Cennini (1606 – August 1684) was a Roman Catholic prelate who served as Bishop of Gravina di Puglia (1645–1684).

== Biography ==
Domenico Cennini was born in Chiusi, Italy in 1606 and ordained a priest in November 1644. On 6 March 1645, he was appointed during the papacy of Pope Innocent X as Bishop of Gravina di Puglia. On 19 March 1645, he was consecrated bishop by Giulio Cesare Sacchetti, Cardinal-Priest of Santa Susanna, with Onorato Onorati, Bishop of Urbania e Sant'Angelo in Vado, and Papirio Silvestri, Bishop of Macerata e Tolentino, serving as co-consecrators. He served as Bishop of Gravina di Puglia until his death in August 1684.

While bishop, he was the principal co-consecrator of Salvatore Scaglione, Bishop of Castellammare di Stabia (1678).

== External links and additional sources ==
- Cheney, David M. "Diocese of Gravina". Catholic-Hierarchy.org. (for Chronology of Bishops) ^{[self-published]}
- Chow, Gabriel. "Diocese of Gravina (Italy)". GCatholic.org. (for Chronology of Bishops) ^{[self-published]}

Catholic Church titles
Preceded by Filippo Cansacchi	Bishop of Gravina di Puglia; 1645–1684	Succeeded by Domenico Valvassori
