= Antonio Ricci =

Antonio Ricci may refer to:

- Antonio Ricci (bishop of Lecce) (died 1483), Italian Roman Catholic bishop
- Antonio Ricci (archbishop of Reggio Calabria) (died 1488), Italian Roman Catholic bishop
- Antonio Ricci (painter) (c1565-c1635), Italian-born Spanish painter
- Antonio Ricci (bishop of Arezzo) (1573–1637), Italian Roman Catholic bishop
- Antonio Ricci (TV producer) (born 1950), Italian television writer
