= Cristóbal Senmanat y Robuster =

1xth-century Catholic bishop

Most Reverend Cristóbal Robuster y Senmanat
- Bishop of Orihuela
- Church: Catholic Church
- Diocese: Diocese of Orihuela
- In office: 1587–1593
- Predecessor: Tomás Dacio
- Successor: José Esteve Juan

Orders
- Consecration: 25 Nov 1587 by Giovanni Battista Castagna

Personal details
- Born: 1524 Reus, Catalonia, Spain
- Died: 19 October 1597 (aged 72–73) Rome, Italy

Cristóbal Robuster y Senmanat or Cristóbal Robuster y Senmanat (1524–1597) was a Roman Catholic prelate who served as Bishop of Orihuela (1587–1593).

== Biography ==
Cristóbal Robuster y Senmanat was born in Reus, Catalonia, Spain in 1524. On 17 Aug 1587, he was appointed during the papacy of Pope Sixtus V as Bishop of Orihuela. On 25 Nov 1587, he was consecrated bishop by Giovanni Battista Castagna, Cardinal-Priest of San Marcello, with Scipione Gonzaga, Titular Patriarch of Jerusalem, and Vincenzo Casali, Bishop Emeritus of Massa Marittima, serving as co-consecrators. He served as Bishop of Orihuela until his resignation on 9 Nov 1593. He died on 19 Oct 1597 in Rome, Italy.

== Episcopal succession ==
While bishop, he was the principal co-consecrator of:

- Alfonso Laso Sedeño, Bishop of Gaeta (1588);
- Juan González de Mendoza, Bishop of Lipari (1593);
- Marco Magnacervo, Bishop of Lucera (1593);
- Vincenzo Giustiniani, Bishop of Gravina di Puglia (1593);
- Annibale D'Afflitto, Archbishop of Reggio Calabria (1593);
- Cesare Del Pezzo, Bishop of Valva e Sulmona (1593);
- Juan Orozco Covarrubias y Leiva, Bishop of Agrigento (1594);
- Juan López, Bishop of Crotone (1595);
- Metello Bichi, Bishop of Sovana (1596); and
- Alessandro Marzi de' Medici, Bishop of Fiesole (1596).

== External links and additional sources ==
- Cheney, David M. "Diocese of Orihuela-Alicante". Catholic-Hierarchy.org. (for Chronology of Bishops)
- Chow, Gabriel. "Diocese of Orihuela-Alicante (Spain)". GCatholic.org. (for Chronology of Bishops)

Catholic Church titles
Preceded by Tomás Dacio	Bishop of Orihuela; 1587–1593	Succeeded by José Esteve Juan
