= Vincenzo Giustiniani (disambiguation) =

Vincenzo Giustiniani (1564–1637) was an Italian aristocrat, banker, art collector and intellectual.

Vincenzo Giustiniani may also refer to:

- Vincenzo Giustiniani (Dominican) (1516–1582), cardinal
- Vincenzo Giustiniani (bishop of Gravina di Puglia) (died 1614)
- Vincenzo Giustiniani (bishop of Brescia) (1590–1645)
