= Antonio de' Tolomei =

Most Reverend Antonio de' Tolomei
- Bishop of Lecce
- Church: Catholic Church
- Diocese: Diocese of Lecce
- In office: 1485–1498
- Predecessor: Roberto Caracciolo
- Successor: Luigi d'Aragona

Personal details
- Died: 1498 Lecce, Italy

Antonio de' Tolomei (died 1498) was a Roman Catholic prelate who served as Bishop of Lecce (1485–1498).

== Biography ==
On 18 July 1485, Antonio de' Tolomei was appointed by Pope Innocent VIII as Bishop of Lecce. He served as Bishop of Lecce until his death in 1498.

== External links and additional sources ==
- Cheney, David M. "Archdiocese of Lecce". Catholic-Hierarchy.org. (for Chronology of Bishops) ^{[self-published]}
- Chow, Gabriel. "Metropolitan Archdiocese of Lecce(Italy)". GCatholic.org. (for Chronology of Bishops) ^{[self-published]}

Catholic Church titles
Preceded by Roberto Caracciolo	Bishop of Lecce; 1485–1498	Succeeded by Luigi d'Aragona
