= Tommaso Morganti =

Most Reverend Tommaso Morganti
- Bishop of Lecce
- Church: Catholic Church
- Diocese: Diocese of Lecce
- In office: 1409–1419
- Successor: Curello Ciccaro

Personal details
- Died: 1419 Lecce, Italy

Tommaso Morganti (died 1419) was a Roman Catholic prelate who served as Bishop of Lecce (1409–1419).

== Biography ==
In 1409, Tommaso Morganti was appointed by Pope Gregory XII as Bishop of Lecce. He served as Bishop of Lecce until his death in 1419.

== External links and additional sources ==
- Cheney, David M. "Archdiocese of Lecce". Catholic-Hierarchy.org. (for Chronology of Bishops) ^{[self-published]}
- Chow, Gabriel. "Metropolitan Archdiocese of Lecce(Italy)". GCatholic.org. (for Chronology of Bishops) ^{[self-published]}

Catholic Church titles
Preceded by	Bishop of Lecce; 1409–1419	Succeeded by Curello Ciccaro
