= Curello Ciccaro =

Most Reverend Curello Ciccaro
- Bishop of Lecce
- Church: Catholic Church
- Diocese: Diocese of Lecce
- In office: 1419–1429
- Predecessor: Tommaso Morganti
- Successor: Tommaso Ammirato

Personal details
- Died: 1429 Lecce, Italy

Curello Ciccaro (died 1429) was a Roman Catholic prelate who served as Bishop of Lecce (1419–1429).

== Biography ==
According to David M. Cheney, on 19 December 1419, Curello Ciccaro was appointed by Pope Martin V as Bishop of Lecce. According to Konrad Eubel, Ciccaro was appointed Bishop of Lecce by Antipope John XXIII on 19 December 1412.

He served as Bishop of Lecce until his death in 1429.

== External links and additional sources ==
- Cheney, David M. "Archdiocese of Lecce". Catholic-Hierarchy.org. (for Chronology of Bishops) ^{[self-published]}
- Chow, Gabriel. "Metropolitan Archdiocese of Lecce(Italy)". GCatholic.org. (for Chronology of Bishops) ^{[self-published]}

Catholic Church titles
Preceded by Tommaso Morganti	Bishop of Lecce; 1419–1429	Succeeded by Tommaso Ammirato
