= Pomponio Cotta =

Italian Roman Catholic prelate (died 1579)

Most Reverend Pomponio Cotta
- Bishop of Novara
- Church: Catholic Church
- Diocese: Roman Catholic Diocese of Novara
- In office: 1577–1579
- Predecessor: Gerolamo Ragazzoni
- Successor: Francesco Bossi

Personal details
- Died: 11 September 1579 Novara, Italy

Pomponio Cotta (died 11 September 1579) was a Roman Catholic prelate who served as Bishop of Novara (1577–1579).

== Biography ==
On 19 July 1577, Pomponio Cotta was appointed during the papacy of Pope Gregory XIII as Bishop of Novara. He served as Bishop of Novara until his death on 11 September 1579.

== External links and additional sources ==
- Cheney, David M. "Diocese of Novara". Catholic-Hierarchy.org. (for Chronology of Bishops) ^{[self-published]}
- Chow, Gabriel. "Diocese of Novara (Italy)". GCatholic.org. (for Chronology of Bishops) ^{[self-published]}

Catholic Church titles
Preceded by Gerolamo Ragazzoni	Bishop of Novara; 1577–1579	Succeeded by Francesco Bossi
