= Arcasio Ricci =

17th-century Roman Catholic bishop

Most Reverend Arcasio Ricci
- Bishop of Gravina di Puglia
- Church: Catholic Church
- Diocese: Roman Catholic Diocese of Gravina di Puglia
- In office: 1630–1636
- Predecessor: Arcangelo Baldini
- Successor: Filippo Cansacchi

Orders
- Consecration: 24 Nov 1630 by Antonio Marcello Barberini (seniore)

Personal details
- Born: 1590 Pescia, Italy
- Died: 8 Feb 1636 (age 46) Gravina, Italy

Arcasio Ricci (1590–1636) was a Roman Catholic prelate who served as Bishop of Gravina di Puglia (1630–1636).

== Biography ==
Arcasio Ricci was born in 1590 in Pescia, Italy. On 13 Nov 1630, he was appointed during the papacy of Pope Urban VIII as Bishop of Gravina di Puglia. On 24 Nov 1630, he was consecrated bishop by Antonio Marcello Barberini (seniore), Cardinal-Priest of Sant'Onofrio, with Giovanni Battista Scanaroli, Titular Bishop of Sidon, and Ulderico Carpegna, Bishop of Gubbio, serving as co-consecrators. He served as Bishop of Gravina di Puglia until his death on 8 Feb 1636 in Gravina, Italy.

== External links and additional sources ==
- Cheney, David M. "Diocese of Gravina". Catholic-Hierarchy.org. (for Chronology of Bishops) ^{[self-published]}
- Chow, Gabriel. "Diocese of Gravina (Italy)". GCatholic.org. (for Chronology of Bishops) ^{[self-published]}

Catholic Church titles
Preceded by Arcangelo Baldini	Bishop of Gravina di Puglia; 1630–1636	Succeeded by Filippo Cansacchi
