= Agostino Cassandra =

17th-century Roman Catholic bishop

Most Reverend Agostino Cassandra
- Bishop of Gravina di Puglia
- Church: Catholic Church
- Diocese: Diocese of Gravina di Puglia
- In office: 1614–1623
- Predecessor: Vincenzo Giustiniani
- Successor: Giulio Cesare Sacchetti

Orders
- Consecration: 28 Dec 1614 by Marcello Lante della Rovere

Personal details
- Born: 1564 Castrofidardo, Italy
- Died: September 1623 (aged 58–59)

Agostino Cassandra (1564–1623) was a Roman Catholic prelate who served as Bishop of Gravina di Puglia (1614–1623).

== Biography ==
Agostino Cassandra was born in Castrofidardo, Italy. He was appointed Bishop of Gravina di Puglia on 24 Nov 1614, during the papacy of Pope Paul V. On 28 Dec 1614, he was consecrated bishop by Marcello Lante della Rovere, Bishop of Todi, with Ulpiano Volpi, Archbishop of Chieti, and Cesare Lippi, Bishop of Cava de' Tirreni, serving as co-consecrators. He served as Bishop of Gravina di Puglia until his death in Sep 1623.

== External links and additional sources ==
- Cheney, David M. "Diocese of Gravina". Catholic-Hierarchy.org. (for Chronology of Bishops) ^{[self-published]}
- Chow, Gabriel. "Diocese of Gravina (Italy)". GCatholic.org. (for Chronology of Bishops) ^{[self-published]}

Catholic Church titles
| Preceded by Vincenzo Giustiniani | Bishop of Gravina di Puglia; 1614–1623 | Succeeded by Giulio Cesare Sacchetti |
