= Pietro Matteo d'Aquino =

Italian Roman Catholic prelate

Most Reverend Pietro Matteo d'Aquino
- Church: Catholic Church
- Diocese: Diocese of Lecce
- In office: 1508–1511
- Predecessor: Giacomo Piscicelli
- Successor: Ugolino Martelli (bishop)
- Previous post: Bishop of Gravina di Puglia (1482–1508)

Personal details
- Died: 1511 Lecce, Italy

Pietro Matteo d'Aquino (died 1511) was a Roman Catholic prelate who served as Bishop of Lecce (1508–1511) and Bishop of Gravina di Puglia (1482–1508).

In 1482, Pietro Matteo d'Aquino was appointed during the papacy of Pope Sixtus IV as Bishop of Gravina di Puglia. On 18 February 1508, he was appointed during the papacy of Pope Julius II as Bishop of Lecce. He served as Bishop of Lecce until his death in 1511.

== External links and additional sources ==
- Cheney, David M. "Diocese of Gravina". Catholic-Hierarchy.org. (for Chronology of Bishops) ^{[self-published]}
- Chow, Gabriel. "Diocese of Gravina (Italy)". GCatholic.org. (for Chronology of Bishops) ^{[self-published]}
- Cheney, David M. "Archdiocese of Lecce". Catholic-Hierarchy.org. (for Chronology of Bishops) ^{[self-published]}
- Chow, Gabriel. "Metropolitan Archdiocese of Lecce(Italy)". GCatholic.org. (for Chronology of Bishops) ^{[self-published]}

Catholic Church titles
Preceded by Giacomo Vittorio Appiani	Bishop of Gravina di Puglia; 1482–1508	Succeeded by Antonio Brancaccio
Preceded by Giacomo Piscicelli	Bishop of Lecce; 1508–1511	Succeeded by Ugolino Martelli (bishop)
