= Domenico Valvassori =

Italian Roman Catholic prelate

Most Reverend Domenico Valvassori
- Bishop of Gravina di Puglia
- Church: Catholic Church
- Diocese: Diocese of Gravina di Puglia
- In office: 1686–1689
- Predecessor: Domenico Cennini
- Successor: Marcello Cavalieri

Orders
- Consecration: 25 March 1686 by Alessandro Crescenzi (cardinal)

Personal details
- Born: 5 August 1627 Trezzo, Italy
- Died: 2 October 1689 (age 62) Gravina di Puglia, Italy

Domenico Valvassori, O.S.A. (5 August 1627 – 2 October 1689) was a Roman Catholic prelate who served as Bishop of Gravina di Puglia (1686–1689).

== Biography ==
Domenico Valvassori was born in Trezzo, Italy on 5 August 1627 and ordained a priest in the Order of Saint Augustine. On 18 March 1686, he was appointed during the papacy of Pope Innocent XI as Bishop of Gravina di Puglia. On 25 March 1686, he was consecrated bishop by Alessandro Crescenzi (cardinal), Cardinal Priest of Santa Prisca, with Giuseppe Eusanio, Titular Bishop of Porphyreon, and Pier Antonio Capobianco, Bishop Emeritus of Lacedonia, serving as co-consecrators. He served as Bishop of Gravina di Puglia until his death on 2 October 1689.

== External links and additional sources ==
- Cheney, David M. "Diocese of Gravina". Catholic-Hierarchy.org. (for Chronology of Bishops) ^{[self-published]}
- Chow, Gabriel. "Diocese of Gravina (Italy)". GCatholic.org. (for Chronology of Bishops) ^{[self-published]}

Catholic Church titles
Preceded by Domenico Cennini	Bishop of Gravina di Puglia; 1686–1689	Succeeded by Marcello Cavalieri
