= Gastone Ettore Paganelli =

Italian Roman Catholic prelate

Most Reverend Gastone Ettore Paganelli
- Bishop of Gravina di Puglia
- Church: Catholic Church
- Diocese: Diocese of Gravina di Puglia
- In office: 1574–1575
- Predecessor: Francesco Bossi
- Successor: Giulio Ricci

Personal details
- Died: 1575 Gravina di Puglia, Italy

Gastone Ettore Paganelli (died 1575) was a Roman Catholic prelate who served as Bishop of Gravina di Puglia (1574–1575).

In 1574, Gastone Ettore Paganelli was appointed during the papacy of Pope Gregory XIII as Bishop of Gravina di Puglia. He served as Bishop of Gravina di Puglia until his death in 1575.

== External links and additional sources ==
- Cheney, David M. "Diocese of Gravina". Catholic-Hierarchy.org. (for Chronology of Bishops) ^{[self-published]}
- Chow, Gabriel. "Diocese of Gravina (Italy)". GCatholic.org. (for Chronology of Bishops) ^{[self-published]}

Catholic Church titles
Preceded by Francesco Bossi	Bishop of Gravina di Puglia; 1574–1575	Succeeded by Giulio Ricci
