= José Esteve Juan =

Roman Catholic prelate

Most Reverend José Esteve Juan
- Bishop of Orihuela
- Church: Catholic Church
- Diocese: Diocese of Orihuela
- In office: 1594–1603
- Predecessor: Cristóbal Senmanat y Robuster
- Successor: Andrés Balaguer Salvador
- Previous post: Bishop of Vieste (1586–1589)

Orders
- Consecration: April 1586 by Giulio Antonio Santorio

Personal details
- Born: 1550 Valencia, Spain
- Died: 2 November 1603 (age 53) Orihuela, Spain

José Esteve Juan (also Giuseppe Esteve Stefano) (1550 – 2 November 1603) was a Roman Catholic prelate who served as Bishop of Orihuela (1594–1603) and Bishop of Vieste (1586–1589).

== Biography ==
José Esteve Juan was born in Valencia, Spain in 1550. On 17 March 1586, he was appointed during the papacy of Pope Sixtus V as Bishop of Vieste. On April 1586, he was consecrated bishop by Giulio Antonio Santorio, Cardinal-Priest of San Bartolomeo all'Isola, with Marco Antonio Marsilio, Archbishop of Salerno, and Scipione de Tolfa, Archbishop of Trani, serving as co-consecrators. In 1589, he resigned as Bishop of Vieste. On 12 January 1594, he was appointed during the papacy of Pope Clement VIII as Bishop of Orihuela. He served as Bishop of Orihuela until his death on 2 November 1603.

== Episcopal succession ==
While bishop, he was the principal co-consecrator of:

- Ludovico de Torres, Archbishop of Monreale (1588); and
- Alfonso Laso Sedeño, Bishop of Gaeta (1588).

== External links and additional sources ==
- Cheney, David M. "Diocese of Vieste". Catholic-Hierarchy.org. (for Chronology of Bishops) ^{[self-published]}
- Chow, Gabriel. "Diocese of Vieste (Italy)". GCatholic.org. (for Chronology of Bishops) ^{[self-published]}
- Cheney, David M. "Diocese of Orihuela-Alicante". Catholic-Hierarchy.org. (for Chronology of Bishops) ^{[self-published]}
- Chow, Gabriel. "Diocese of Orihuela-Alicante (Spain)". GCatholic.org. (for Chronology of Bishops) ^{[self-published]}

Catholic Church titles
Preceded by Anselmo Olivieri	Bishop of Vieste; 1586–1589	Succeeded by Thomas Cammerota
Preceded by Cristóbal Senmanat y Robuster	Bishop of Orihuela; 1594–1603	Succeeded by Andrés Balaguer Salvador
