= Giacomo Piscicelli =

Roman Catholic bishop

Most Reverend Giacomo Piscicelli
- Bishop of Lecce
- Church: Catholic Church
- Diocese: Diocese of Lecce
- In office: 1502–1507
- Predecessor: Luigi d'Aragona
- Successor: Pietro Matteo d'Aquino

Personal details
- Died: 1507 Lecce, Italy

Giacomo (or, Jacopo) Piscicelli (died 1507) was a Roman Catholic prelate who served as Bishop of Lecce (1502–1507).

== Biography ==
Giacomo, or Jacopo, Piscicelli, was born a member of the Piscicelli noble Neapolitan family.

On 24 March 1502, he was appointed by Pope Alexander VI as Bishop of Lecce. He served as Bishop of Lecce until he died in 1507.

== External links and additional sources ==
- Cheney, David M. "Archdiocese of Lecce". Catholic-Hierarchy.org. (for Chronology of Bishops) ^{[self-published]}
- Chow, Gabriel. "Metropolitan Archdiocese of Lecce(Italy)". GCatholic.org. (for Chronology of Bishops) ^{[self-published]}

Catholic Church titles
Preceded by Luigi d'Aragona	Bishop of Lecce; 1502–1507	Succeeded by Pietro Matteo d'Aquino
