= Giacomo Vittorio Appiani =

Roman Catholic Bishop

Most Reverend Giacomo Vittorio Appiani
- Bishop of Gravina di Puglia
- Church: Catholic Church
- Diocese: Diocese of Gravina di Puglia
- In office: 1473–1482
- Successor: Pietro Matteo d'Aquino

Personal details
- Died: 1482 Gravina di Puglia, Italy

Giacomo Vittorio Appiani (died 1482) was a Roman Catholic prelate who served as Bishop of Gravina di Puglia (1473–1482).

== Biography ==
In 1473, Giacomo Vittorio Appiani was appointed during the papacy of Pope Sixtus IV as Bishop of Gravina di Puglia. He served as Bishop of Gravina di Puglia until his death in 1482.

Catholic Church titles
Preceded by	Bishop of Gravina di Puglia; 1473–1482	Succeeded by Pietro Matteo d'Aquino
