= Francisco Desquivel =

Spanish archbishop

Francisco d'Esquivel or Desquivel (c. 1550 in Vitoria – 21 December 1624 in Cagliari) was a Spanish archbishop and a major figure in the history of Sardinia.

== Life ==
He was the son of Francisco de Ali d'Esquivel and his wife Maria de Landa. In 1584 he gained degree in civil and church law at the University of Leon, where he later taught for a few years. He became vicar or deputy to the bishop of Castel Rodrigo and around 1595 took charge of the Inquisition on Majorca. In this post he gained the support not only of the population but also of Philip IV of Spain, who in 1604 nominated him to be archbishop of Cagliari. Pope Paul V confirmed his election to the post on 20 June 1605.

In 1606 he took on the post and left the Inquisition on Sardinia in the hands of a deputy, though he remained a point of reference throughout the kingdom of Sardinia due to his experience in the field right up until the appointment of a permanent inquisitor. He called two diocesan synods and made several pastoral visits across his archdiocese, generally giving a positive assessment of its parish priests but punishing those who did not meet the requirement to remain resident in their parish. On his initiative and that of his predecessors, the city council and parliament, the University of Cagliari was set up via a papal bull of 1606 and a royal diploma of 1620. He also set up a diocesan seminary and both this and the university were staffed by the Jesuits.

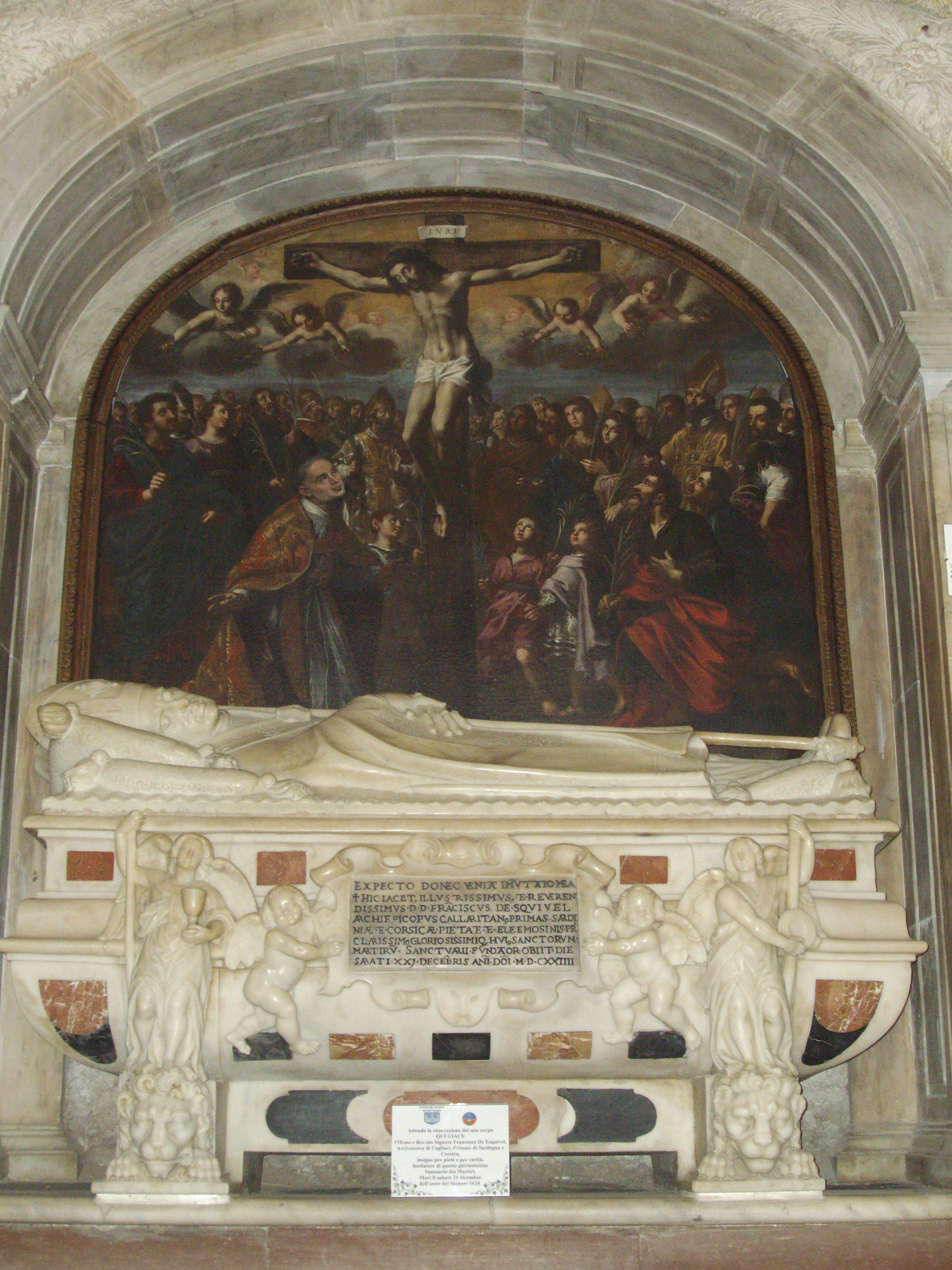
The tomb of Desquivel.

In 1618 he set up a teaching institution dedicated to teaching the ruling classes their cultural background – such teaching had previously been very poor, except for those who could afford to study in mainland Spain or Italy. This 'Collegio dei nobili' was still operational in 2015 as the 'Convitto nazionale Vittorio Emanuele', having been renamed during the Risorgimento.

At the time of his holding office, there was a campaign of polemics over whether the archbishop of Sassiari or of Cagliari should have primacy in Sardinia. The archbishop of Sassiari supported his claim by rehousing the recently rediscovered relics of Saint Gavino, Saint Proto and Saint Gianuario in the new Basilica of San Gavino at Porto Torres. Desquivel responded by organizing archaeological excavations in 1614 in the areas where popular cults had sprung up around early Christian martyrs, particularly the Basilica of San Saturnino in Cagliari and at Sulci (Isola di Sant'Antioco).

At Cagliari he personally led excavations, which found a stone inscribed + S....INUM..., which was interpreted as 'sancti innumerabiles' or 'innumerable saints'. In the following years several human bones and skeletons were found and identified as those of saints Cesello, Camerino, Lussorio and finally Saturnino, patron saint of the city. To honour these relics Desquivel built a new crypt in Cagliari Cathedral, containing a Sanctuary of the Martyrs with three chapels dedicated to the Virgin Mary, Saturnino and Saint Lucifero, one of the city's first bishops and author of important works combatting heresy. This contained 617 rosettes and 167 different niches, each with the name of the saint whose relics it contained, all in hand-carved polychrome marble. These still survive. Despite his requests to return to Spain, Desquivel remained at Cagliari until his death in December 1624 after an eighteen-day illness. His body was buried in the Sanctuary of the Martyrs.

== Bibliography ==
- Francesco Cesare Casula, ad vocem, in Dizionario storico sardo. Edizione riveduta e ampliata Cagliari, L'unione sarda, 2006, volume 5, pp. 1156–1157.
- Giuseppe Manno, Storia di Sardegna, Torino, Alliana e Paravia, 1825–1827.
- Pietro Martini, Storia ecclesiastica di Sardegna, Cagliari, Stamperia reale, 1839–1841.
- Alberto Pala, I vescovi di Cagliari: 1605-1624 Francesco Desquivel, "L'eco della primaziale", 2011, 31–35.
- Pasquale Tola, ad vocem, in Dizionario biografico degli uomini illustri di Sardegna, Torino, Tipografia Chirio e Mina, 1837–1838, volume 2 , pp. 68–70.
- Raimondo Turtas, Storia della chiesa in Sardegna: dalle origini al Duemila, Roma, Città nuova, 1999.

Catholic Church titles
Preceded by Alfonso Laso Sedeño	Archbishop of Cagliari; 1605–1624	Succeeded by Lorenzo Nieto y Corrales Montero Nieto
