= Scipione Spina =

Most Reverend Scipione Spina
- Bishop of Lecce
- Church: Catholic Church
- Diocese: Diocese of Lecce
- In office: 1591–1639
- Predecessor: Annibale Saraceni
- Successor: Luigi Pappacoda

Orders
- Consecration: 3 June 1591 by Giulio Antonio Santorio

Personal details
- Died: 6 March 1639 Lecce, Italy

Scipione Spina (died 6 March 1639) was a Roman Catholic prelate who served as Bishop of Lecce (1591–1639).

== Biography ==
On 10 May 1591, Scipione Spina was appointed during the papacy of Pope Gregory XIV as Bishop of Lecce. On 3 June 1591, he was consecrated bishop by Giulio Antonio Santorio, Cardinal-Priest of San Bartolomeo all'Isola, with Flaminio Filonardi, Bishop of Aquino, and Leonard Abel, Titular Bishop of Sidon, serving as co-consecrators. He served as Bishop of Lecce until his death on 6 March 1639.

== Episcopal succession ==
Episcopal succession of Scipione Spina

While bishop, he was the principal co-consecrator of:

- Ascanio Parisi, Coadjutor Bishop of Marsico Nuovo (1599);
- Giovanni Agostino Gandolfo, Bishop of Fondi (1619); and
- Alessandro Suardi, Bishop of Lucera (1619).

== External links and additional sources ==
- Cheney, David M. "Archdiocese of Lecce". Catholic-Hierarchy.org. (for Chronology of Bishops) ^{[self-published]}
- Chow, Gabriel. "Metropolitan Archdiocese of Lecce(Italy)". GCatholic.org. (for Chronology of Bishops) ^{[self-published]}

Catholic Church titles
Preceded by Annibale Saraceni	Bishop of Lecce; 1591–1639	Succeeded by Luigi Pappacoda
