= Horatius Ondedei =

Italian Roman Catholic prelate

Most Reverend Horatius Ondedei
- Bishop of Urbania e Sant'Angelo in Vado
- Church: Catholic Church
- Diocese: Diocese of Urbania and Sant'Angelo in Vado
- In office: 1684–1688
- Predecessor: Onorato Onorati
- Successor: Pietro Barugi

Orders
- Consecration: 16 April 1684 by Alessandro Crescenzi (cardinal)

Personal details
- Born: 9 February 1630 Gubbio, Italy
- Died: March 1688 (age 58)

Horatius Ondedei (9 February 1630 – March, 1688) was a Roman Catholic prelate who served as Bishop of Urbania e Sant'Angelo in Vado (1684–1688).

== Biography ==
Horatius Ondedei was born in Gubbio, Italy on 9 February 1630. He was ordained a deacon on 2 February 1684 and ordained a priest on 6 February 1684. On 10 April 1684, he was appointed during the papacy of Pope Innocent XI as Bishop of Urbania e Sant'Angelo in Vado. On 16 April 1684, he was consecrated bishop by Alessandro Crescenzi (cardinal), Cardinal-Priest of Santa Prisca, with Giacomo Altoviti, Titular Patriarch of Antioch, and Odoardo Cibo, Titular Archbishop of Seleucia in Isauria, serving as co-consecrators. He served as Bishop of Urbania e Sant'Angelo in Vado until his death in March 1688.

Catholic Church titles
| Preceded by Onorato Onorati | Bishop of Urbania e Sant'Angelo in Vado; 1684–1688 | Succeeded by Pietro Barugi |
