= Giovanni Angelo Pellegrini =

Italian Roman Catholic prelate

Most Reverend Giovanni Angelo Pellegrini
- Bishop of Gravina di Puglia
- Church: Catholic Church
- Diocese: Diocese of Gravina di Puglia
- In office: 1552–1568
- Predecessor: Luca Rinaldi
- Successor: Francesco Bossi
- Previous post: Bishop of Fondi (1537–1552)

Personal details
- Died: 1568 Gravina di Puglia, Italy

Giovanni Angelo Pellegrini (died 1568) was a Roman Catholic prelate who served as Bishop of Gravina di Puglia (1552–1568) and Bishop of Fondi (1537–1552).

== Biography ==
On 14 March 1537, Giovanni Angelo Pellegrini was appointed during the papacy of Pope Paul III as Bishop of Fondi. On 14 December 1552, he was appointed during the papacy of Pope Julius III as Bishop of Gravina di Puglia. He served as Bishop of Gravina di Puglia until his death in 1568.

While bishop, he was the principal co-consecrator of James Beaton, Archbishop of Glasgow (1552).

== External links and additional sources ==
- Cheney, David M. "Diocese of Gravina". Catholic-Hierarchy.org. (for Chronology of Bishops) ^{[self-published]}
- Chow, Gabriel. "Diocese of Gravina (Italy)". GCatholic.org. (for Chronology of Bishops) ^{[self-published]}

Catholic Church titles
Preceded by Giacomo Pellegrini	Bishop of Fondi; 1537–1552	Succeeded by Fausto Caffarelli
Preceded by Luca Rinaldi	Bishop of Gravina di Puglia; 1552–1568	Succeeded by Francesco Bossi
