= Vincenzo Giustiniani (bishop of Gravina di Puglia) =

Roman Catholic bishop

Most Reverend Vincenzo Giustiniani
- Church: Catholic Church
- See: Diocese of Gravina di Puglia
- In office: 1593–1614
- Predecessor: Antonio Maria Manzolio
- Successor: Agostino Cassandra

Orders
- Consecration: 29 Aug 1593 by Alfonso Gesualdo di Conza

Personal details
- Born: 1550 Chios, Greece
- Died: 1614 (age 64)

Vincenzo Giustiniani (died 1614) was a Roman Catholic prelate who served as Bishop of Gravina di Puglia (1593–1614).

== Biography ==
Vincenzo Giustiniani was born in Chios, Greece in 1550. On 2 August 1593, he was appointed as Bishop of Gravina di Puglia during the papacy of Pope Clement VIII. On 29 August 1593, he was consecrated bishop by Alfonso Gesualdo di Conza, Cardinal-Bishop of Ostia e Velletri, with Melchiorre Pelletta, Titular Bishop of Chrysopolis in Arabia, and Cristóbal Robuster y Senmanat, Bishop of Orihuela, serving as co-consecrators. He served as the local bishop until his death in 1614.

While bishop, he was the principal co-consecrator of Marco Giustiniani, Bishop of Chios (1604).

== External links and additional sources ==
- Cheney, David M. "Diocese of Gravina". Catholic-Hierarchy.org. (for Chronology of Bishops) ^{[self-published]}
- Chow, Gabriel. "Diocese of Gravina (Italy)". GCatholic.org. (for Chronology of Bishops) ^{[self-published]}

Catholic Church titles
Preceded by Antonio Maria Manzolio	Bishop of Gravina di Puglia; 1593–1614	Succeeded by Agostino Cassandra
