= Tommaso Ammirato =

Roman Catholic prelate

Most Reverend Tommaso Ammirato
- Bishop of Lecce
- Church: Catholic Church
- Diocese: Diocese of Lecce
- In office: 1429–1438
- Predecessor: Curello Ciccaro
- Successor: Guido Giudano

Personal details
- Died: 1438 Lecce, Italy

Tommaso Ammirato (died 1438) was a Roman Catholic prelate who served as Bishop of Lecce (1429–1438).

== Biography ==
Tommaso Ammirato was ordained a priest in the Order of Saint Benedict. On 2 March 1429, he was appointed by Pope Martin V as Bishop of Lecce. He served as Bishop of Lecce until his death in 1438.

== See also ==
- Catholic Church in Italy

== External links and additional sources ==
- Cheney, David M. "Archdiocese of Lecce". Catholic-Hierarchy.org. (for Chronology of Bishops) ^{[self-published]}
- Chow, Gabriel. "Metropolitan Archdiocese of Lecce(Italy)". GCatholic.org. (for Chronology of Bishops) ^{[self-published]}

Catholic Church titles
Preceded by Curello Ciccaro	Bishop of Lecce; 1429–1438	Succeeded by Guido Giudano
