= Luca Rinaldi =

Italian bishop and prelate

Most Reverend Luca Rinaldi
- Bishop of Gravina di Puglia
- Church: Catholic Church
- Diocese: Diocese of Gravina di Puglia
- In office: 1518–1552
- Predecessor: Antonio Brancaccio (bishop)
- Successor: Giovanni Angelo Pellegrini

Personal details
- Died: 1552 Gravina di Puglia, Italy

Luca Rinaldi (died 1552) was a Roman Catholic prelate who served as Bishop of Gravina di Puglia (1518–1552).

== Biography ==
In December 1518, Luca Rinaldi was appointed during the papacy of Pope Leo X as Bishop of Gravina di Puglia. He served as Bishop of Gravina di Puglia until his death in 1552.

== External links and additional sources ==
- Cheney, David M. "Diocese of Gravina". Catholic-Hierarchy.org. (for Chronology of Bishops) ^{[self-published]}
- Chow, Gabriel. "Diocese of Gravina (Italy)". GCatholic.org. (for Chronology of Bishops) ^{[self-published]}

Catholic Church titles
Preceded by Antonio Brancaccio (bishop)	Bishop of Gravina di Puglia; 1518–1552	Succeeded by Giovanni Angelo Pellegrini
