= Annibale Saraceni =

Roman Catholic bishop of Lecce (1560–1591)

Most Reverend Annibale Saraceni
- Bishop of Lecce
- Church: Catholic Church
- Diocese: Diocese of Lecce
- In office: 1560–1591
- Predecessor: Braccio Martelli
- Successor: Scipione Spina

Orders
- Consecration: 15 March 1561

Annibale Saraceni was a Roman Catholic prelate who served as Bishop of Lecce (1560–1591).

== Biography ==
On 29 November 1560, Annibale Saraceni was appointed during the papacy of Pope Pius IV as Bishop of Lecce. On 15 March 1561, he was consecrated bishop by Giovanni Michele Saraceni, Cardinal-Priest of Sant'Anastasia, with Giovanni Giacomo Barba, Bishop of Terni, and Giulio Galletti, Bishop Emeritus of Alessano, serving as co-consecrators. He served as Bishop of Lecce until his resignation in 1591.

== External links and additional sources ==
- Cheney, David M. "Archdiocese of Lecce". Catholic-Hierarchy.org. (for Chronology of Bishops) ^{[self-published]}
- Chow, Gabriel. "Metropolitan Archdiocese of Lecce(Italy)". GCatholic.org. (for Chronology of Bishops) ^{[self-published]}

Catholic Church titles
Preceded by Braccio Martelli	Bishop of Lecce; 1560–1591	Succeeded by Scipione Spina
