= Ugolino Martelli (bishop) =

16th-century Roman Catholic bishop

Most Reverend Ugolino Martelli
- Bishop of Narni
- Church: Catholic Church
- Diocese: Diocese of Narni
- In office: 1517–1523
- Predecessor: Francesco Soderini
- Successor: Carlo Soderini
- Previous post: Bishop of Narni (1517–1523)

Personal details
- Died: 1523

Ugolino Martelli (died 1523) was a Roman Catholic prelate who served as Bishop of Narni (1517–1523) and Bishop of Lecce (1511–1517).

== Biography ==
On 9 April 1511, Ugolino Martelli was appointed during the papacy of Pope Julius II as Bishop of Lecce. On 18 May 1517, he was appointed during the papacy of Pope Leo X as Bishop of Narni. He served as Bishop of Narni until his death in 1523.

== External links and additional sources ==
- Cheney, David M. "Archdiocese of Lecce". Catholic-Hierarchy.org. (for Chronology of Bishops) ^{[self-published]}
- Chow, Gabriel. "Metropolitan Archdiocese of Lecce(Italy)". GCatholic.org. (for Chronology of Bishops) ^{[self-published]}
- Cheney, David M. "Diocese of Narni". Catholic-Hierarchy.org. (Chronology of Bishops) ^{[self-published]}
- Chow, Gabriel. "Diocese of Narni (Italy)". GCatholic.org. Archived from the original on 4 February 2014. (Chronology of Bishops) ^{[self-published]}

Catholic Church titles
| Preceded by Pietro Matteo d'Aquino | Bishop of Lecce; 1511–1517 | Succeeded by Giovanni Antonio Acquaviva d'Aragona |
| Preceded by Francesco Soderini | Bishop of Narni; 1517–1523 | Succeeded by Carlo Soderini |
