= Thomas Cammerota =

Most Reverend Thomas Cammerota
- Bishop of Vieste
- Church: Catholic Church
- Diocese: Diocese of Vieste
- In office: 1589
- Predecessor: José Esteve Juan
- Successor: Maschio Ferracuti

Orders
- Consecration: 26 July 1589 by Girolamo Bernerio

Personal details
- Died: September 1589 Vieste, Italy

Thomas Cammerota O.P. (also Tommaso Malatesta) (died September, 1589) was a Roman Catholic prelate who served as Bishop of Vieste (1589).

== Biography ==
Thomas Cammerota was ordained a priest in the Order of Preachers. On 17 July 1589, he was appointed during the papacy of Pope Sixtus V as Bishop of Vieste. On 26 July 1589, he was consecrated bishop by Girolamo Bernerio, Bishop of Ascoli Piceno, with Girolamo Bevilacqua, Titular Archbishop of Nazareth, and Gaspare Pasquali, Bishop of Ruvo, serving as co-consecrators. He served as Bishop of Vieste until his death in September 1589.

== See also ==
- Catholic Church in Italy

== External links and additional sources ==
- Cheney, David M. "Diocese of Vieste". Catholic-Hierarchy.org. (for Chronology of Bishops) ^{[self-published]}
- Chow, Gabriel. "Diocese of Vieste (Italy)". GCatholic.org. (for Chronology of Bishops) ^{[self-published]}

Catholic Church titles
Preceded by José Esteve Juan	Bishop of Vieste; 1589	Succeeded by Maschio Ferracuti
