= Francesco Bossi =

Italian Roman Catholic prelate

Most Reverend Francesco Bossi
- Bishop of Novara
- Church: Catholic Church
- Diocese: Diocese of Novara
- In office: 1579–1583
- Predecessor: Pomponio Cotta
- Successor: Gaspare Visconti
- Previous posts: Bishop of Gravina (1568–1574); Bishop of Perugia (1574–1579)

Orders
- Consecration: 28 August 1568 by Otto Truchseß von Waldburg

Personal details
- Born: 1525 Milan, Italy
- Died: 18 September 1583 (age 58) Novara, Italy

Francesco Bossi (1525 – 18 September 1583) was a Roman Catholic prelate who served as Bishop of Novara (1579–1583), Bishop of Perugia (1574–1579), and Bishop of Gravina (1568–1574).

== Biography ==
Francesco Bossi was born in Milan in 1525. On 2 August 1568, he was appointed during the papacy of Pope Pius V as Bishop of Gravina. On 28 August 1568, he was consecrated bishop by Otto Truchseß von Waldburg, Bishop of Augsburg. On 5 May 1574, he was appointed during the papacy of Pope Gregory XIII as Bishop of Perugia. On 21 October 1579, he was appointed during the papacy of Pope Gregory XIII as Bishop of Novara. He served as Bishop of Novara until his death on 18 September 1583.

While bishop, he was the principal co-consecrator of Ottavio Santacroce, Bishop of Cervia (1576), and Ottaviano Paravicini, Bishop of Alessandria (della Paglia) (1584).

== See also ==
- Catholic Church in Italy

== External links and additional sources ==
- Cheney, David M. "Diocese of Gravina". Catholic-Hierarchy.org. (for Chronology of Bishops) ^{[self-published]}
- Chow, Gabriel. "Diocese of Gravina (Italy)". GCatholic.org. (for Chronology of Bishops) ^{[self-published]}
- Cheney, David M. "Archdiocese of Perugia-Città della Pieve". Catholic-Hierarchy.org. (for Chronology of Bishops) ^{[self-published]}
- Chow, Gabriel. "Metropolitan Archdiocese of Perugia-Città della Pieve (Italy)". GCatholic.org. (for Chronology of Bishops) ^{[self-published]}
- Cheney, David M. "Diocese of Novara". Catholic-Hierarchy.org. (for Chronology of Bishops) ^{[self-published]}
- Chow, Gabriel. "Diocese of Novara (Italy)". GCatholic.org. (for Chronology of Bishops) ^{[self-published]}

Catholic Church titles
Preceded by Giovanni Angelo Pellegrini	Bishop of Gravina; 1568–1574	Succeeded by Gastone Ettore Paganelli
Preceded by Fulvio Giulio della Corgna	Bishop of Perugia; 1574–1579	Succeeded by Vincenzo Ercolano
Preceded by Pomponio Cotta	Bishop of Novara; 1579–1583	Succeeded by Gaspare Visconti
