= Antonio Brancaccio (bishop) =

Italian Roman Catholic prelate

Most Reverend Antonio Brancaccio
- Bishop of Gravina di Puglia
- Church: Catholic Church
- Diocese: Diocese of Gravina di Puglia
- In office: 1508–1518
- Predecessor: Pietro Matteo d'Aquino
- Successor: Luca Rinaldi

Personal details
- Died: 1518 Gravina di Puglia, Italy

Antonio Brancaccio, O.P. or Antonio Brancati (died 1518) was a Roman Catholic prelate who served as Bishop of Gravina di Puglia (1508–1518).

== Biography ==
Antonio Brancaccio was ordained a priest in the Order of Preachers. On 18 February 1508, he was appointed during the papacy of Pope Julius II as Bishop of Gravina di Puglia. He served as Bishop of Gravina di Puglia until his death in 1518.

== External links and additional sources ==
- Cheney, David M. "Diocese of Gravina". Catholic-Hierarchy.org. (for Chronology of Bishops) ^{[self-published]}
- Chow, Gabriel. "Diocese of Gravina (Italy)". GCatholic.org. (for Chronology of Bishops) ^{[self-published]}

Catholic Church titles
Preceded by Pietro Matteo d'Aquino	Bishop of Gravina di Puglia; 1508–1518	Succeeded by Luca Rinaldi
