= Antonio Ricci (bishop of Lecce) =

Most Reverend Antonio Ricci
- Bishop of Lecce
- Church: Catholic Church
- Diocese: Diocese of Lecce
- In office: 1453–1483
- Predecessor: Guido Giudano
- Successor: Roberto Caracciolo

Personal details
- Died: 24 December 1483 Lecce, Italy

Antonio Ricci (died 24 December 1483) was a Roman Catholic prelate who served as Bishop of Lecce (1453–1483).

== Biography ==
On 20 July 1453, Antonio Ricci was appointed by Pope Nicholas V as Bishop of Lecce. He served as Bishop of Lecce until his death on 24 December 1483.

== External links and additional sources ==
- Cheney, David M. "Archdiocese of Lecce". Catholic-Hierarchy.org. (for Chronology of Bishops) ^{[self-published]}
- Chow, Gabriel. "Metropolitan Archdiocese of Lecce(Italy)". GCatholic.org. (for Chronology of Bishops) ^{[self-published]}

Catholic Church titles
Preceded by Guido Giudano	Bishop of Lecce; 1453–1483	Succeeded by Roberto Caracciolo
