= Fausto Caffarelli =

Most Reverend Fausto Caffarelli
- Bishop of Fondi
- Church: Catholic Church
- Diocese: Diocese of Fondi
- In office: 1555–1566
- Predecessor: Giovanni Angelo Pellegrini
- Successor: Matteo Andrea Guerra

Personal details
- Died: 1566 Fondi, Italy

Fausto Caffarelli (died 1566) was a Roman Catholic prelate who served as Bishop of Fondi (1555–1566).

== Biography ==
On 17 July 1555, Fausto Caffarelli was appointed during the papacy of Pope Paul IV as Bishop of Fondi. He served as Bishop of Fondi until his death in 1537.

Catholic Church titles
Preceded by Giovanni Angelo Pellegrini	Bishop of Fondi; 1555–1566	Succeeded by Matteo Andrea Guerra
