= Archdiocese of Lecce =

Roman Catholic archdiocese in Italy

Coordinates: 40.3520°N 18.1691°E

Archdiocese of Lecce Archidioecesis Lyciensis

Catholic
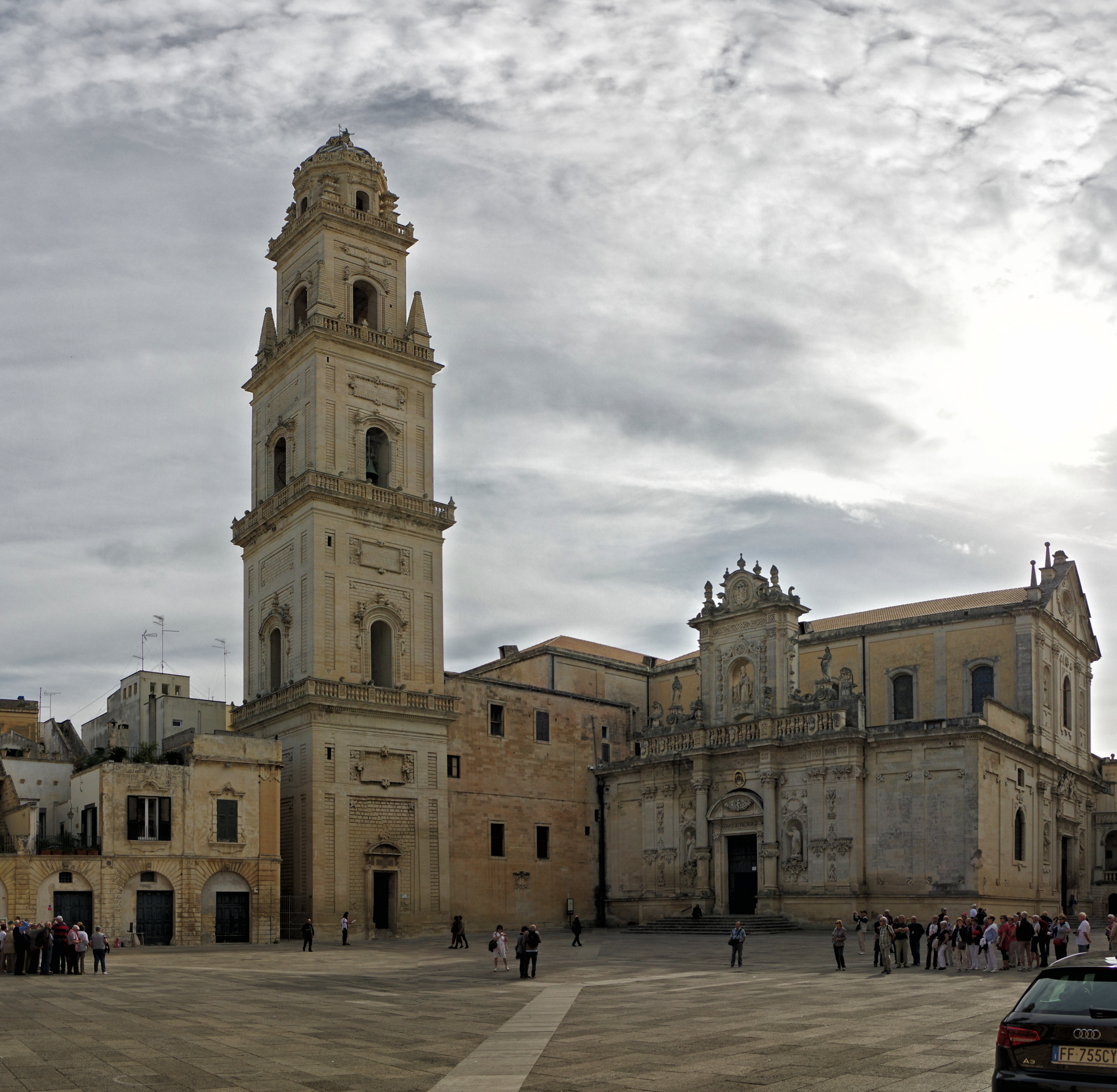
- Lecce Cathedral

Location
- Country: Italy
- Ecclesiastical province: Lecce

Statistics
- Area: 750 km^{2} (290 sq mi)
- Population: Total; Catholics: (as of 2023); 265,602 ▼; 262,306 ▼ (98.8%)
- Parishes: 77

Information
- Denomination: Catholic Church
- Sui iuris church: Latin Church
- Rite: Roman Rite
- Established: 11th century
- Cathedral: Cattedrale di Maria SS. Assunta
- Secular priests: 119 (diocesan) ▲51 (Religious Orders) ▲27 Permanent Deacons ▼

Current leadership
- Pope: Leo XIV
- Archbishop: Angelo Raffaele Panzetta
- Bishops emeritus: Domenico Umberto D’Ambrosio; Michele Seccia

Map
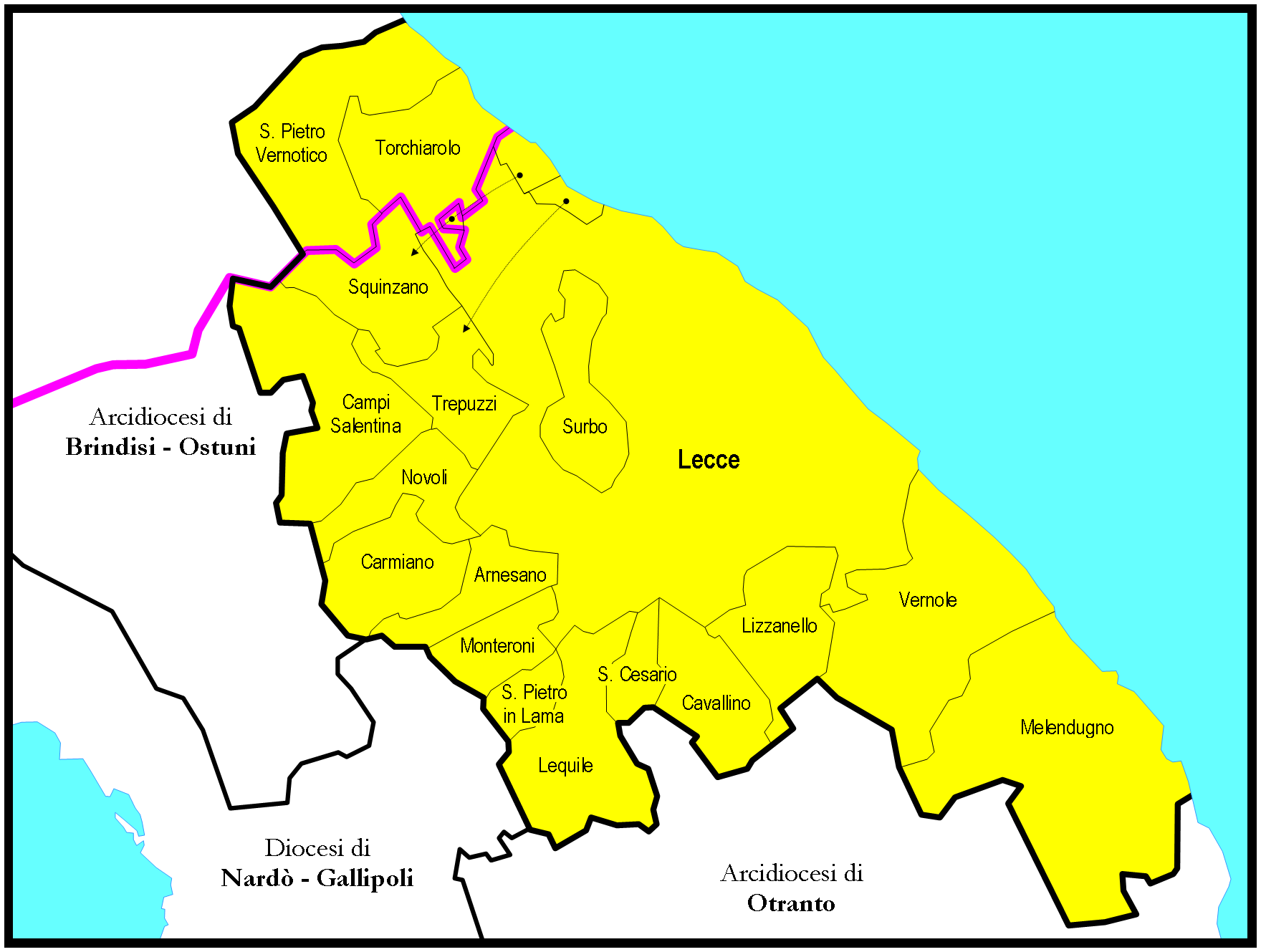

Website
- www.diocesilecce.org

The Archdiocese of Lecce (Latin: Archidioecesis Lyciensis) is a Latin Church ecclesiastical territory or archdiocese of the Catholic Church in Apulia, southern Italy. The diocese has existed since the 11th century. On 28 September 1960, in the bull Cum a nobis, Pope John XXIII separated the diocese of Lecce from the ecclesiastical province of Otranto and made it directly subject to the Holy See. In the bull Conferentia Episcopalis Apuliae issued on 20 October 1980, Pope John Paul II created the ecclesiastical province of Lecce, with the Archdiocese of Otranto becoming a suffragan diocese.

== History ==
Many years ago, Lecce was known as Lupiæ, Lupia, Lycia, and Aletium. Beginning around the year 1060, Lecce became the seat of a Norman count. One of its notable counts, Tancred of Lecce, contested Emperor Henry VI for the Kingdom of the Two Sicilies. Another count was Gautier de Brienne, a cousin of Tancred.

=== Chapter and cathedral ===
The cathedral of Lecce, which was, like nearly all the cathedrals in the Kingdom of Naples, dedicated in honor of the assumption of the body of the Virgin Mary into heaven, was administered and served by a Chapter. The cathedral Chapter was composed of three dignities (the Archdeacon, the Cantor, and the Treasurer) and twenty-four Canons. In 1671, there were twenty Canons. In 1741, there were again twenty-four Canons. In 1885, after the unification of Italy, there were four dignities (the Archdeacon, the Treasurer, the Parocco and the Theologus); there were sixteen other Canons. In 2019, there were ten Canons (Canonici effetivi), and eight honorary Canons.

There was also a collegiate church, the Collegiata di Campi Salentino, which had twenty-seven Canons, headed by an Archpriest and four dignities.

The seminary building was built between 1694 and 1709, by Bishop Michele Pignatelli and Bishop Fabrizio Pignatelli, to designs by Giuseppe Cino. In 1885, the seminary had thirteen teachers and thirty clerics studying for the priesthood; in the previous five years there had been four ordinations and sixty deaths of priests.

=== Subject to the Holy See ===
Up until 1960, Lecce had been a suffragan (subordinate) of the archbishopric of Otranto. Reacting to the large increase in population, and to the fact that Lecce had been made a provincial capital by the Italian government, Pope John XXIII issued the bull "Cum a Nobis" on 28 September 1960, separating Lecce from its relationship with the diocese of Otranto and making it directly subject to the Holy See.

=== Metropolitan archdiocese ===
Following the Second Vatican Council, and in accordance with the norms laid out in the council's decree, Christus Dominus chapter 40, the Episcopal Conference of Apulia petitioned the Holy See (Pope) that Lecce be made a metropolitan and that a new ecclesiastical province be created. After wide consultations among all affected parties, Pope John Paul II issued a decree on 20 October 1980, elevating Lecce to the status of metropolitan see. He also created the new ecclesiastical province of Lecce, whose constituent bishoprics (suffragans) were to be: Brindisi (no longer a metropolitanate, though the archbishop allowed to retain the title of archbishop), Otranto (no longer a metropolitanate, though the archbishop allowed to retain the title of archbishop), Gallipoli, Nardò, Ostuno, and Uxentina-S. Mariae Leucadensis (Ugento).

== Bishops and Archbishops of Lecce ==
=== to 1500 ===
...

- Teodoro Bonsecolo (attested 1092, 1101)
- Formosus (attested 1114, 1115)
- Penetranus (attested 1179)
- Petrus Guarinus (1179–1182)
- Fulco Bellus (1196–1200)
- Robertus Volterico (1212–1230)

Sede vacante (attested 1239)

- Gualterus de Massafra (attested 1254, 1255)
- Robertus de Sancto Blasio (c. 1260?)
- Petrus de Romana (1267) Bishop-elect
- Ignotus (1268–1269)
- Gervasius
- Godefredus
- Robertus de Noha (attested 1301)
- Joannes de Glandis (1339–1348)
- Robertus (Guarini) (1348– ? )
- Antonius de Ferraris (1373– ? )
- Nicolaus de Tarento (1384– ? ) Avignon Obedience
- Ludovicus ( ? ) Roman Obedience
- Leonardus (1386–1389) Roman Obedience
- Antonius de Viterbo, O.Min. (1389–1412)
- Tommaso Morganti (1409–1412)
- Curello Ciccaro (1412–1429)
- Tommaso Ammirato, OSB (1429–1438)
- Guido Giudano, OFM (6 Aug 1438 – 1453)
- Antonio Ricci (20 Jul 1453 – 24 Dec 1483 died)

Roberto Caracciolo, OFM (1484–1485)

- Marc'Antonio de' Tolomei (1485–1498)

Cardinal Luigi d'Aragona (1498–1502) Apostolic Administrator

=== 1500 to 1800 ===
- Giacomo Piscicelli (1502–1507)
- Pietro Matteo d'Aquino (1508–1511)
- Ugolino Martelli (1511–1517)
- Giovanni Antonio Acquaviva d'Aragona (1517–1525)
- Consalvo di Sangro (19 Jan 1525 – 1530 died)
- Alfonso di Sangro (1530–1534 resigned) Bishop-elect

Ippolito de' Medici (20 Apr 1534 – 26 Feb 1535) Administrator

- Giovanni Battista Castromediano (26 Feb 1535 – 1552 died)
- Braccio Martelli (12 Feb 1552 – 17 Aug 1560 died)
- Annibale Saraceni (29 Nov 1560 – 1591 resigned)
- Scipione Spina (10 May 1591 – 6 Mar 1639 died)
- Luigi Pappacoda (1639–1670)
- Antonio Pignatelli del Rastrello (1671 –1682)
- Michele Pignatelli, CR (1682–1695)
- Fabrizio Pignatelli (1696–1734)
- Giuseppe Maria Ruffo (25 May 1735 –1744)
- Scipione Sersale (3 Feb 1744 – 11 Jul 1751 died)
- Alfonso Sozi Carafa, CRS (15 Nov 1751 – 19 Feb 1783 died)

Sede vacante (1783–1792)

- Salvatore Spinelli, OSB (26 Mar 1792 –1797)

Sede vacante (1797–1818)

=== 1800 to present ===
Giuseppe Maria Giovene (1807–1818) Vicar Apostolic

- Nicola Caputo de' Marchesi di Cerreto (21 Dec 1818 – 6 Nov 1862 died)

Sede vacante (1862–1872)

- Valerio Laspro (1872–1877)
- Salvatore Luigi Zola, CRL (22 Jun 1877 – 27 Apr 1898 died)
- Evangelista (Michael Antonio) di Milia, OFM Cap. (10 Nov 1898 – 17 Sep 1901 died)
- Gennaro Trama (14 Feb 1902 – 9 Nov 1927 died)
- Alberto Costa (7 Dec 1928 – 2 Aug 1950 died)
- Francesco Minerva (17 December 1950 – 27 January 1981 retired)
- Michele Mincuzzi (27 January 1981 – 7 December 1988 retired)
- Cosmo Francesco Ruppi (7 December 1988 – 16 April 2009 retired)
- Domenico Umberto D'Ambrosio (16 April 2009 - 29 September 2017 retired)
- Michele Seccia (29 September 2017 – present)
- Angelo Raffaele Panzetta (appointed on 18 June 2025)

== Bibliography ==
=== Reference for bishops ===
- Gams, Pius Bonifatius (1873). Series episcoporum Ecclesiae catholicae: quotquot innotuerunt a beato Petro apostolo (in Latin). Ratisbon: Typis et Sumptibus Georgii Josephi Manz. p. 890.
- Eubel, Conradus, ed. (1913). Hierarchia catholica (in Latin). Vol. Tomus 1 (second ed.). Münster: Libreria Regensbergiana.
- Eubel, Conradus, ed. (1914). Hierarchia catholica (in Latin). Vol. Tomus 2 (second ed.). Münster: Libreria Regensbergiana.
- Gulik, Guilelmus (1923). Eubel, Conradus (ed.). Hierarchia catholica (in Latin). Vol. Tomus 3 (second ed.). Münster: Libreria Regensbergiana.
- Gauchat, Patritius (Patrice) (1935). Hierarchia catholica (in Latin). Vol. Tomus IV (1592-1667). Münster: Libraria Regensbergiana.
- Ritzler, Remigius; Sefrin, Pirminus (1952). Hierarchia catholica medii et recentis aevi V (1667-1730). Patavii: Messagero di S. Antonio.
- Ritzler, Remigius; Sefrin, Pirminus (1958). Hierarchia catholica medii et recentis aevi (in Latin). Vol. Tomus VI (1730-1799). Patavii: Messagero di S. Antonio.
- Ritzler, Remigius; Sefrin, Pirminus (1968). Hierarchia Catholica medii et recentioris aevi sive summorum pontificum, S. R. E. cardinalium, ecclesiarum antistitum series... A pontificatu Pii PP. VII (1800) usque ad pontificatum Gregorii PP. XVI (1846) (in Latin). Vol. VII. Monasterii: Libr. Regensburgiana.
- Remigius Ritzler; Pirminus Sefrin (1978). Hierarchia catholica Medii et recentioris aevi... A Pontificatu PII PP. IX (1846) usque ad Pontificatum Leonis PP. XIII (1903) (in Latin). Vol. VIII. Il Messaggero di S. Antonio.
- Pięta, Zenon (2002). Hierarchia catholica medii et recentioris aevi... A pontificatu Pii PP. X (1903) usque ad pontificatum Benedictii PP. XV (1922) (in Latin). Vol. IX. Padua: Messagero di San Antonio. ISBN 978-88-250-1000-8.

=== Studies ===
- Cappelletti, Giuseppe (1870). Le chiese d'Italia dalla loro origine sino ai nostri giorni (in Italian). Vol. Tomo vigesimo primo (21). Venezia: G. Antonelli. pp. 311–317.
- Cosi, Luisa; Spedicato, Mario, eds. (1995). Vescovi e città nell'epoca barocca: Una capitale di periferia, Lecce al tempo del Pappacoda (in Italian). Congedo. ISBN 978-88-8086-131-7.
- De Leo, Pietro (1973). "Contributo per una nuova Lecce Sacra," in: La Zagaglia: rassegna di scienze, lettere e arti, 57-58 (1973), pp. 3–24 (prima parte, pp. 3–13; seconda parte, pp. 14–24); 65-66 (1975), pp. 3–34
- De Luca, Francesco (2005). Il capitolo cattedrale di Lecce e il suo archivio (in Italian). Lecce: Milella. ISBN 9788870484267.
- De Simone, Luigi Giuseppe (1874). Lecce e i suoi monumenti: descritti ed illustrati. La città (in Italian). Vol. primo. Lecce: Tipi di Campanella.
- Kamp, Norbert (1975). Kirche und Monarchie im staufischen Königreich Sizilien. I. Prosopographische Grundlegung: 2. Apulien und Kalabrien. München: Wilhelm Fink Verlag. (in German)
- Kehr, Paul Fridolin (1962). Italia pontificia. Vol. IX: Samnium — Apulia — Lucania. Berlin: Weidmann. (in Latin)
- Leverano, Girolamo Marci di (1855). Descrizione, origini, e successi della provincia d'Otranto (in Italian). Napoli: stamperia dell' Iride. pp. 554–561.
- Paladini, G. (1932). Studii e memorie storiche sull'antica Lupiae o Sibari del Salente. Lecce: tip. Modernissima, 1932. (in Italian)
- Ughelli, Ferdinando; Coleti, Niccolo (1721). Italia sacra sive De Episcopis Italiae, et insularum adjacentium (in Latin). Vol. Tomus nonus (9). Venice: apud Sebastianum Coleti. pp. 67–86.
