= Piscicelli =

Piscicelli is a surname. Notable people with the surname include:

- Giacomo Piscicelli (died 1507), Roman Catholic prelate
- Salvatore Piscicelli (1948–2024), Italian director, screenwriter, and film critic
