= Filippo Cansacchi =

Italian Roman Catholic prelate

Most Reverend Domenico Cennini
- Bishop of Gravina di Puglia
- Church: Catholic Church
- Diocese: diocese of Gravina di Puglia
- In office: 1637–1645
- Predecessor: Arcasio Ricci
- Successor: Domenico Cennini

Orders
- Consecration: 1 January 1637 by Giulio Cesare Sacchetti

Personal details
- Died: 1645 Gravina di Puglia, Italy

Filippo Cansacchi or Filippo Consacchi (died 1645) was a Roman Catholic prelate who served as Bishop of Gravina di Puglia (1637–1645).

== Biography ==
On 15 December 1636, Filippo Cansacchi was appointed during the papacy of Pope Urban VIII as Bishop of Gravina di Puglia. On 1 January 1637, he was consecrated bishop by Giulio Cesare Sacchetti, Cardinal-Priest of Santa Susanna, with Alexandre della Stufa, Bishop of Montepulciano, and Emilio Bonaventura Altieri, Bishop of Camerino, serving as co-consecrators. He served as Bishop of Gravina di Puglia until his death in 1645.

While bishop, he was the principal co-consecrator of Gaudius Castelli, Bishop of Montepeloso (1637) and Paolo Pellegrini, Bishop of Capri (1641).

== See also ==
- Catholic Church in Italy

== External links and additional sources ==
- Cheney, David M. "Diocese of Gravina". Catholic-Hierarchy.org. (for Chronology of Bishops) ^{[self-published]}
- Chow, Gabriel. "Diocese of Gravina (Italy)". GCatholic.org. (for Chronology of Bishops) ^{[self-published]}

Catholic Church titles
Preceded by Arcasio Ricci	Bishop of Gravina di Puglia; 1637–1645	Succeeded by Domenico Cennini
