= Roman Catholic Diocese of Vieste =

The Diocese of Vieste (Latin: Dioecesis Vestanus) was a Roman Catholic diocese located in the town in the province of Foggia, in the Apulia region of southeast Italy. On 27 June 1818, the diocese of Viesti was granted to the archbishops of Siponto (Manfredonia) as perpetual Administrators. On 30 September 1986, the diocese of Viesti was suppressed, its territory incorporated into the archdiocese of Siponto, and renamed the Archdiocese of Manfredonia–Vieste. Its former cathedral, named in honor of the Assumption of the body of the Virgin Mary into heaven, is now the Vieste Co-cathedral and, like nearly all cathedrals in Italy, a minor basilica.

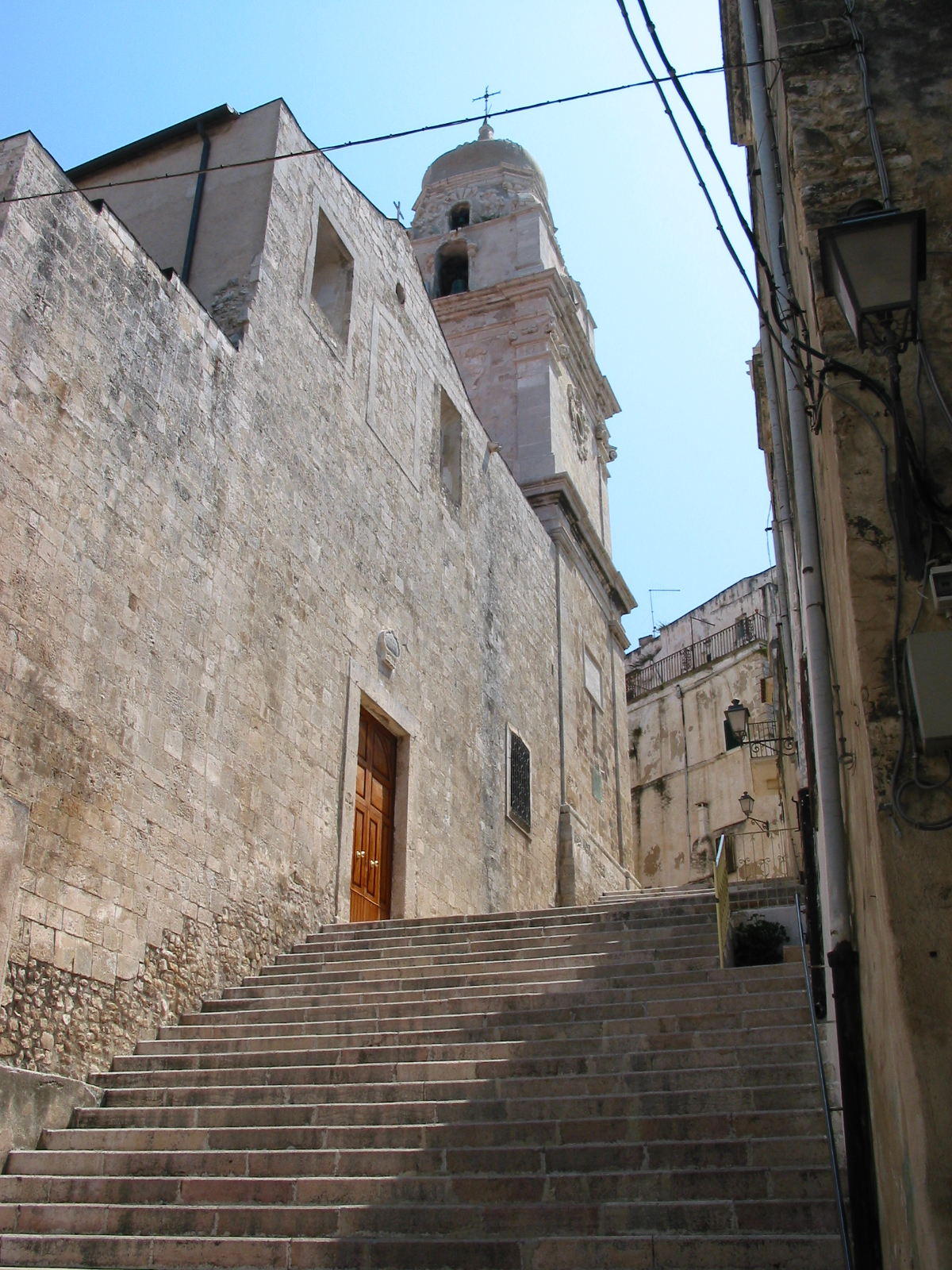
Cathedral of the Assumption, Vieste

== History ==
Pope Paschal II confirmed the Church of Vieste to be a suffragan of the archbishops of Siponto (Manfredonia). Paschal held a synod at Siponti in the spring of 1117, and it is suggested by Kehr that it was on this occasion that his confirmation of ecclesiastical privileges was made. Vieste was confirmed as a suffragan of the archbishops of Siponto in the time of Pope Alexander III (1159–1181).

The city of Viesti was destroyed in 1554 by a Saracen fleet.

=== After Napoleon ===
Following the extinction of the Napoleonic Kingdom of Italy, the Congress of Vienna authorized the restoration of the Papal States and the Kingdom of Naples. Since the French occupation had seen the abolition of many Church institutions in the Kingdom, as well as the confiscation of most Church property and resources, it was imperative that Pope Pius VII and King Ferdinand IV reach agreement on restoration and restitution.

A concordat was finally signed on 16 February 1818, and ratified by Pius VII on 25 February 1818. Ferdinand issued the concordat as a law on 21 March 1818. The re-erection of the dioceses of the kingdom and the ecclesiastical provinces took more than three years. The right of the king to nominate the candidate for a vacant bishopric was recognized, as in the Concordat of 1741, subject to papal confirmation (preconisation). On 27 June 1818, Pius VII issued the bull De Ulteriore, in which he reestablished the metropolitan archbishopric of Siponto (Manrfredonia), but with no suffragan dioceses at all. The diocese of Viesti was given to the archbishop of Siponto in perpetual administratorship.

=== Diocesan Reorganization ===
Following the Second Vatican Council, and in accordance with the norms laid out in the council's decree, Christus Dominus chapter 40, Pope Paul VI ordered a reorganization of the ecclesiastical provinces in southern Italy. Pope Paul VI ordered consultations among the members of the Congregation of Bishops in the Vatican Curia, the Italian Bishops Conference, and the various dioceses concerned.

On 18 February 1984, the Vatican and the Italian State signed a new and revised concordat. Based on the revisions, a set of Normae was issued on 15 November 1984, which was accompanied in the next year, on 3 June 1985, by enabling legislation. According to the agreement, the practice of having one bishop govern two separate dioceses at the same time, aeque personaliter, was abolished. The Vatican continued consultations which had begun under Pope John XXIII for the merging of small dioceses, especially those with personnel and financial problems, into one combined diocese.

On 30 September 1986, Pope John Paul II ordered that the dioceses of Siponto and Viesti be merged into one diocese with one bishop, with the Latin title Archidioecesis Sipontina-Vestana. The seat of the diocese was to be in Manfredonia, and its cathedral was to serve as the cathedral of the merged diocese. The cathedral in Viesti was to have the honorary titles of "co-cathedral"; the cathedral Chapter was to be a Capitulum Concathedralis. There was to be only one diocesan Tribunal, in Manfredonia, and likewise one seminary, one College of Consultors, and one Priests' Council. The territory of the new diocese was to include the territory of the suppressed dioceses of Viesti. The town of Rignano Garganico, however, was detached from the diocese, and assigned to the diocese of S. Severo.

== Bishops of Vieste ==
=== to 1547 ===
...

- Alfanus (attested c. 994 – 1035)

...

- Marandus (before 1170)

...

- Simeon (attested 1179)

...

- Petrus (c. 1225)
- Theoduinus (1227)

...

- Johannes (attested 1274–1275)

...

- Angelo (1291? – death 1302)

Gabriel, O.S.B. (1303) Bishop-elect

- Giovanni, Augustinian Order O.E.S.A. (1304 – ?)

...

- Elia Seguini, O.P. (1343.10.27 – 1349)
- Nicola, O.F.M. (1349 – 1361?)
- Cristoforo (1361 – 1371)
- Rainaldo di Monte Sant’Angelo, O.F.M. (9 June 1371 – 1385?)
- Samparinus (1385? – 1387)
- Antonio (13 August 1387 – 24 March 1390) Roman Obedience
- Guilelmus Simonelli (1387 – 1420) Avignon Obedience
- Samparino (1390 – death 1403) Roman Obedience
- Lorenzo de Gilotto (1403 – 1405) Roman Obedience
- Francesco (1405 – 1420?) Roman Obedience
- Giovanni de Ruvo (1420 – after 1440)

...

- Benedetto Bernardi, O.P. (1477 – 1495)
- Carlo Bocconi (1495.10.23 – death 1505)
- Latino Pio (1505 – 1514)
- Giovanni Francesco Salvini (1514 – 1516)
- Girolamo Magnani, O.F.M. (1518 – death 1527)
- Ludovico Buono (1527.02.18 – death 1528)
- Leonardo Bonafide, O.S.B. (1528.01.24 – 1529)
- Alfonso Albornoz Alarcon (Carilli) (3 Aug 1530 Appointed – 1547 Died)

=== 1547 to 1818 ===
- Pellegrino Fabio (1 Jul 1547 Appointed – 14 Sep 1551 Died)
- Giulio Pavesi, O.P. (1555.10.02 – 1558.07.20)
- Ugo Boncompagni (1558.07.20 – 1565.03.12)
- Antonio Ganguzia (1565.10.20 – death 1574.03.08)
- Anselmo Olivieri, O.F.M. (1574.03.20 – ?)
- José Esteve Juan (1586.03.17 – 1594)
- Thomas Cammerota, O.P. (1589.07.17 – death 1589)
- Maschio Ferracuti (1589.10.25 – death 1613.07.14)
- Muzio Vitali (1613.11.13 – death 1615)
- Paolo Palumbo, C.R. (1615.05.18 – 1617)
- Ambrogio Palumbo, O.P. (1618.02.12 – death 1641)
- Paolo Ciera, O.E.S.A. (1642.01.13 – death 1644.05.27)
- Giacomo Accarisi (1644.10.17 – death 1654)
- Giovanni Mastelloni (1654.10.19 – death 1668.07.28)
- Raimondo del Pozzo (1668.11.10 – death 1694.10.30)
- Andrea Tontoli (1695.02.07 – death 1696.10.21); previously Bishop of Alessano (1666 – 1695.02.07)
- Francesco Antonio Volturale (1697.01.14 – death 1697.10.18)
- Lorenzo Kreutter de Corvinis, O.S.B. Silv. (1697.11.20 – death 1701.07.14)
- Giovanni Antonio Ruggiero (1703.05.14 – death 1704.10.08)
- Camillo Caravita (1704.12.15 – death 1713.09.24)
- Giuseppe Grisconi, Sch. P. (1718.01.24 – death 1719.09.16)
- Marco Antonio De Marco (1720.04.15 – 1725.03.21); later Metropolitan Archbishop of Manfredonia (Italy) (1725.03.21 – death 1742.04)
- Nicola Preti Castriota (1725.04.18 – 1748.12.01)
- Nicola Cimaglia, O.S.B. Cel. (1748.12.16 – death 1764.05.27)
- Giuseppe Maruca (1764.08.20 – death 1784.12.27)
- Dominicus Arcaroli (1792.03.26 – 1817.11.10); previously Bishop of Lavello (1776.01.29 – 1792.03.26); emeritate as Titular Archbishop of Bostra (1817.11.10 – 1826.06.25)

== Bibliography ==
=== Episcopal lists ===
- Eubel, Conradus, ed. (1913). Hierarchia catholica (in Latin). Vol. I (second ed.). Münster: Libreria Regensbergiana.
- Eubel, Conradus, ed. (1914). Hierarchia catholica (in Latin). Vol. II (second ed.). Münster: Libreria Regensbergiana.
- Eubel, Conradus; Gulik, Guilelmus (1923). Hierarchia catholica (in Latin). Vol. III (second ed.). Münster: Libreria Regensbergiana.
- Gams, Pius Bonifatius (1873). Series episcoporum Ecclesiae catholicae: quotquot innotuerunt a beato Petro apostolo (in Latin). Ratisbon: Typis et Sumptibus Georgii Josephi Manz. pp. 852–853.
- Gauchat, Patritius (Patrice) (1935). Hierarchia catholica (in Latin). Vol. IV (1592-1667). Münster: Libraria Regensbergiana.
- Ritzler, Remigius; Sefrin, Pirminus (1952). Hierarchia catholica medii et recentis aevi (in Latin). Vol. V (1667-1730). Patavii: Messagero di S. Antonio.
- Ritzler, Remigius; Sefrin, Pirminus (1958). Hierarchia catholica medii et recentis aevi (in Latin). Vol. VI (1730-1799). Patavii: Messagero di S. Antonio.

=== Studies ===
- Cappelletti, Giuseppe (1870). Le chiese d'Italia: dalla loro origine sino ai nostri giorni (in Italian). Vol. vigesimo (20). Venezia: G. Antonelli. pp. 595–600.
- D'Avino, Vincenzo (1848). Cenni storici sulle chiese arcivescovili, vescovili, e prelatizie (nulluis) del Regno delle Due Sicilie (in Italian). Napoli: Ranucci. pp. .
- Kamp, Norbert (1975). Kirche und Monarchie im staufischen Königreich Sizilien: I. Prosopographische Grundlegung, Bistumer und Bistümer und Bischöfe des Konigreichs 1194–1266: 2. Apulien und Calabrien München: Wilhelm Fink 1975.
- Kehr, Paulus Fridolin (1962). Italia pontificia. Regesta pontificum Romanorum. Vol. IX: Samnia – Apulia – Lucania. Berlin: Weidmann. (in Latin). pp. 268–270.
- Ughelli, Ferdinando; Coleti, NIccolo (1721). Italia sacra sive De episcopis Italiæ, et insularum adjacentium (in Latin). Vol. Tomus septimus (7). Venice: apud Sebastianum Coleti. pp. 866–878.
