= Roman Catholic Diocese of Gravina-Montepeloso =

The diocese of Gravina and Montepeloso is a former ecclesiastical territory of the Roman Catholic Church in Apulia, southern Italy. Gravina is about 59 km (36 mi) southwest of Bari. Since 1986 it has formed part of the merged diocese of Altamura-Gravina-Acquaviva. Gravina in Apulia was the seat of the episcopal see from the ninth century.

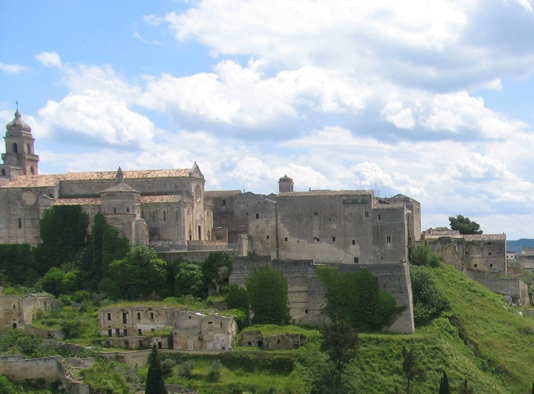
The cathedral of The Assumption of the Virgin Mary, Gravina

== Ecclesiastical history ==
Bishop Petrus of Hydruntum (968) was raised to the dignity of Metropolitan by Polyeuctus, Patriarch of Constantinople (956-970), with the obligation to establish the Byzantine Rite throughout the new ecclesiastical province, and the authority to consecrate bishops in the churches of Acerenza, Tursi, Gravina, Matera, and Tricarico, all previously dependent on the Church of Rome. The Latin Church was introduced again after the Norman conquest, but the Byzantine Rite remained in use in several towns of the archdiocese and of its suffragans, until the sixteenth century.

The first known bishop of Gravina is Leo; other bishops of note are: Giacomo Orsini (1302), who replaced the Greek rite with the Latin (Roman) rite, by order of Gentile Orsini Archbishop of Acerenza; Vincenzo Giustianiani (1593), a Genoese nobleman, who founded the seminary, the church of the Madonna delle Grazie and the Capuccinelle convent; Domenico Cennini (1645), who rebuilt the episcopal residence; Fra Domenico Valvassori (1686), a patron of learning and founder of an Accademia Teologica.

On 16 June 1102, Pope Paschal II confirmed for the archbishop of Acerenza all his diocese's privileges and possessions, including the suffragan (subordinate) diocese of Gravina.

At the end of 1608, the palace of the dukes of Gravina was transferred to the bishops of Gravina, since they had had constructed a new palace in the Via S. Tommaso. Ferdinando (Ferrante) and his wife, Giovanna Frangipane della Tolfa, also began the construction of S. Maria, called the "Purgatorio" in 1644.

On 12 February 1649, Pietro Francesco Orsini, known in religion as Vincenzo Maria Orsini, O.P., the future Pope Benedict XIII, was born in Gravina. He was the eldest son of Ferdinando (Ferrante), 11th Duke of Gravina, 2nd Prince of Solofra, and Count of Muro Lucano, 2nd Prince di Galluccio.

=== Reorganization ===
Following the expulsion of the French occupying forces in 1816, and the restoration of the Papal States and the Kingdom of Naples, a new concordat was signed on 16 February 1818, and ratified by Pius VII on 25 February 1818. Ferdinand I of the Two Sicilies issued the concordat as a law on 21 March 1818. The right of the king to nominate the candidate for a vacant bishopric was recognized, as in the Concordat of 1741, subject to papal confirmation (preconisation). On 27 June 1818, Pius VII issued the bull De Ulteriore, in which he joined the diocese of Gravina, which had been a suffragan of the archdiocese of Potenza, to the diocese of Montepeluso in perpetual union, as the Diocese of Gravina e Montepeloso, one bishop to preside over both dioceses, aeque principaliter. Montepelosi was the dominant partner. Both dioceses were to be directly subject to the Holy See.

Montepeloso is situated on a hill in the neighbouring Province of Potenza. The diocese dated back to the 12th century and was refounded in the 15th century; it is directly subject to the Holy See. Montepeloso has been called Irpina since 1895. The united dioceses, directly subject to the Holy See, had in the early 20th century 9 parishes and some 28,000 baptized people. In 1986, the diocese of Montepeloso (Irpina) was suppressed, and its territory became part of the "Archidioecesis Materanensis-Montis Pelusii".

=== Diocesan Reorganization ===
Following the Second Vatican Council, and in accordance with the norms laid out in the council's decree, Christus Dominus chapter 40, It also recommended the abolition of anomalous units such as exempt territorial prelatures. Pope Paul VI ordered a reorganization of the ecclesiastical provinces in southern Italy, beginning with consultations among the members of the Congregation of Bishops in the Vatican Curia, the Italian Bishops Conference, and the various dioceses concerned.

On 18 February 1984, the Vatican and the Italian State signed a new and revised concordat. Based on the revisions, a set of Normae was issued on 15 November 1984, which was accompanied in the next year, on 3 June 1985, by enabling legislation. According to the agreement, the practice of having one bishop govern two separate dioceses at the same time, aeque personaliter, was abolished. The Vatican continued consultations which had begun under Pope John XXIII for the merging of small dioceses, especially those with personnel and financial problems, into one combined diocese.

On 30 September 1986, Pope John Paul II ordered that the diocese of Gravina be merged with the territorial prelatures of Altamura and of Aquaviva into one diocese with one bishop, with the Latin title Dioecesis Altamurensis-Gravinensis-Aquavivensis. The seat of the diocese was to be in Altamura, where the prelatial church was to serve as the cathedral of the merged diocese. The cathedral in Gravina and the prelatial seat in Aquaviva were to have the honorary titles of "co-cathedral"; the Chapters were each to be a Capitulum Concathedralis. There was to be only one diocesan Tribunal, in Altamura, and likewise one seminary, one College of Consultors, and one Priests' Council. The territory of the new diocese was to include the territory of the suppressed diocese and territorial prelatures. To make the territories of the new diocese congruent, the town of San Teramo in Colle was detached from the archdiocese of Bari-Bitonto and added to that of Altamura. The new diocese was made a suffragan of the archdiocese of Bari-Bitonto.

== Bishops ==
=== Diocese of Gravina (di Puglia) ===
Erected: 9th Century
Metropolitan: Archdiocese of Acerenza e Matera

==== to 1450 ====
...

- Leo (attested 876)

...
Sede vacante (attested in 1091)
...

- Guido (attested 1123/24)

...

- Hugo (attested 1155)

...

- Robertus (attested 1179)
- Thomas (attested 1188 – 1212)
- Samuel (attested 1219 – 1238)

...

- Pantaleone (c. 1245 – 1266)
- Jacobus (1250 – 1266)

Sede vacante (1266 – 1281)

- Petrus, O.S.B. (1282)
- Palmerius (1283 – 1286)
- Nicolaus da Potenza, O.P. (1287 – 1291)
- Johannes (1291 – 1294)
- Jacobus (1296 — 1306)
- Franciscus (1311 – 1318)
- Nicolaus
- Richardus Caracciolo (1335 – 1343)
- Andreas da Perugia, O.Min. (1343 – 1345)
- Tancredus da Auleto, O.Min. (1346 – 1348)
- Bernardus Coccius (1349 – 1350)
- Johannes da Gallinario, O.Min. (1350 – 1373)
- Lucianus da Gravina, O.E.S.A. (1373 – 1381?)
- Nicolaus da Madio, O.P. (1386 – ? ) Avignon Obedience
- Philippus (1386? – 1395) Roman Obedience
- Franciscus (1395 – 1400)
- Antonius (1400 – 1402) Roman Obedience
- Rogerius de Langobardi (1402 – 1411) Roman Obedience
- Henricus, O.Min. (1411 – 1429)
- Giovanni Roberti Santoro (1429 – 1446?)

==== 1447 to 1818 ====
Marino Orsini (Marinus de Ursinis) (1447–1473) Administrator

- Giacomo Vittorio Appiani (1473 – 1482 Died)
- Pietro Matteo d'Aquino (1482 – 12 Feb 1508 Appointed, Bishop of Lecce)
- Antonio Brancaccio (bishop) (Brancati), O.P. (18 Feb 1508 – 1518 Died)
- Luca Rinaldi (1 Dec 1518 – 1552 Died)
- Giovanni Angelo Pellegrini (14 Dec 1552 – 1568 Died)
- Francesco Bossi (2 Aug 1568 – 5 May 1574 Appointed, Bishop of Perugia)
- Gastone Ettore Paganelli (1574 – 1575 Died)
- Giulio Ricci (9 May 1575 – 13 Nov 1581 Appointed, Bishop of Teramo)
- Antonio Maria Manzolio (1581 – 1593 Resigned)
- Vincenzo Giustiniani (2 Aug 1593 – 1614 Died)
- Agostino Cassandra, O.F.M. Conv. (24 Nov 1614 – Sep 1623 Died)
- Giulio Cesare Sacchetti (4 Dec 1623 – 16 Mar 1626 Appointed, Bishop of Fano)
- Arcangelo Baldini, O.P. (20 Jul 1626 – 1629 Died)
- Arcasio Ricci (13 Nov 1630 – Feb 1636 Died)
- Filippo Cansacchi (Consacchi) (15 Dec 1636 – 1645 Died)
- Domenico Cennini (6 Mar 1645 – Aug 1684 Died)
- Domenico Valvassori, O.S.A. (1686 – 1689)
- Marcello Cavalieri, O.P. (11 Jan 1690 – Aug 1705 Died)
- Luigi Capuani (Ludovico Capulani) (14 Dec 1705 – 13 Sep 1708 Died)
- Cesare Francesco Lucini, O.P. (11 May 1718 – 2 Mar 1725 Died)
- Vincenzo Ferrero, O.P. (18 Apr 1725 – 8 Feb 1730 Appointed, Bishop of Lucera)
- Camillo Olivieri (5 Mar 1731 – 21 Aug 1758 Died)
- Nicolò Cicirelli (18 Dec 1758 – May 1790 Died)
- Michele de Angelis (18 Jun 1792 Confirmed – 10 Oct 1806 Died)

Sede vacante (1806 – 1818)

=== Diocese of Gravina e Irsina (Montepeloso) ===
United: 27 June 1818 with the Diocese of Montepeloso
Latin Name: Gravinensis et Montis Pelusii
Immediately Subject to the Holy See

- Ludovico Maria Roselli, O.F.M. (2 Oct 1818 Confirmed – 15 Oct 1818 Died)
- Cassiodoro Margarita (21 Dec 1818 Confirmed – 1 Sep 1850 Died)
- Franciscus Xaverius Giannuzzi Savelli (17 Feb 1851 Confirmed – 14 Aug 1851 Died)
- Mario De Luca (27 Sep 1852 Confirmed – 24 Mar 1855 Died)
- Raffaele Antonio Morisciano (28 Sep 1855 Confirmed – 27 Sep 1858 Appointed, Bishop of Squillace)
- Alfonso Maria Cappetta (Cappelta) (20 Jun 1859 Confirmed – 22 Jul 1871 Died)
- Vincenzo Salvatore (6 May 1872 – 7 Sep 1899 Died)
- Cristoforo Maiello (14 Dec 1899 – 8 Mar 1906 Died)
- Nicolo Zimarino (1906 – 1920)
- Giovanni Maria Sanna, O.F.M. Conv. (1922 – 1953 Retired)
- Aldo Forzoni (14 May 1953 – 30 Nov 1961 Appointed, Bishop of Diano-Teggiano)
- Giuseppe Vairo (19 Jan 1962 – 23 Dec 1971 Resigned)
- Salvatore Isgró (25 Apr 1975 – 18 Mar 1982 Appointed, Archbishop of Sassari)

=== Diocese of Gravina ===
11 October 1976: Diocese Split into the Diocese of Gravina and the Diocese of Matera e Irsina
Metropolitan: Archdiocese of Bari-Canosa

- Tarcisio Pisani, O.M. (28 Jun 1982 – 30 Sep 1986)

On 30 September 1986, the diocese of Gravina was suppressed.

== See also ==
- Roman Catholic Diocese of Montepeloso
- Roman Catholic Diocese of Altamura-Gravina-Acquaviva delle Fonti
- Roman Catholic Archdiocese of Matera-Irsina (-Montepeloso)
- Altamura Cathedral
- List of Catholic dioceses in Italy

== Bibliography ==
=== Episcopal lists ===
- Eubel, Conradus, ed. (1913). Hierarchia catholica (in Latin). Vol. I (second ed.). Münster: Libreria Regensbergiana.
- Eubel, Conradus, ed. (1914). Hierarchia catholica (in Latin). Vol. II (second ed.). Münster: Libreria Regensbergiana. p. 161.
- Eubel, Conradus; Gulik, Guilelmus (1923). Hierarchia catholica (in Latin). Vol. III (second ed.). Münster: Libreria Regensbergiana. p. 205.
- Gams, Pius Bonifatius (1873). Series episcoporum Ecclesiae catholicae: quotquot innotuerunt a beato Petro apostolo (in Latin). Ratisbon: Typis et Sumptibus Georgii Josephi Manz. p. 884.
- Gauchat, Patritius (Patrice) (1935). Hierarchia catholica (in Latin). Vol. IV (1592-1667). Münster: Libraria Regensbergiana.
- Ritzler, Remigius; Sefrin, Pirminus (1952). Hierarchia catholica medii et recentis aevi (in Latin). Vol. V (1667-1730). Patavii: Messagero di S. Antonio.
- Ritzler, Remigius; Sefrin, Pirminus (1958). Hierarchia catholica medii et recentis aevi (in Latin). Vol. VI (1730-1799). Patavii: Messagero di S. Antonio.
- Ritzler, Remigius; Sefrin, Pirminus (1968). Hierarchia Catholica medii et recentioris aevi (in Latin). Vol. VII (1800–1846). Monasterii: Libreria Regensburgiana.
- Remigius Ritzler; Pirminus Sefrin (1978). Hierarchia catholica Medii et recentioris aevi (in Latin). Vol. VIII (1846–1903). Il Messaggero di S. Antonio.
- Pięta, Zenon (2002). Hierarchia catholica medii et recentioris aevi (in Latin). Vol. IX (1903–1922). Padua: Messagero di San Antonio. ISBN 978-88-250-1000-8.

=== Studies ===
- Benigni, Umberto. "Gravina and Montepeloso." The Catholic Encyclopedia. Vol. 6. (New York: Robert Appleton Company, 1909). Retrieved: 10 October 2022.
- Cappelletti, Giuseppe (1870). Le chiese d'Italia dalla loro origine sino ai nostri giorni (in Italian). Vol. vigesimoprimo (21). Venezia: Antonelli. pp. 366–371.
- Duchesne, Louis (1903). "L'eveché de Montepeloso," (in French), in: Mélanges d'archéologie et d'histoire XXIII (1903), pp. 363–373.
- Ianora (Janora), Michele (1901). Memorie storiche, critiche e diplomatiche della città di Montepeloso (oggi Irsina). (in Italian). Matera: Tip. F. Conti, 1901.
- Kamp, Norbert (1975). Kirche und Monarchie im staufischen Königreich Sizilien: I. Prosopographische Grundlegung, Bistumer und Bistümer und Bischöfe des Konigreichs 1194–1266: 2. Apulien und Calabrien München: Wilhelm Fink 1975.
- Kehr, Paulus Fridolin (1962). Italia pontificia. Regesta pontificum Romanorum. Vol. IX: Samnia – Apulia – Lucania. Berlin: Weidmann. (in Latin). pp. 481–482.
- Mattei-Cerasoli, Leone (1918), "Di alcuni vescovi poco noti," (in Italian), in: Archivio storico per le provincie Napolitane XLIII (n.s. IV 1918), pp. 363–382, at pp. 380–381.
- Nardone, Domenico (1922). Notizie storiche sulla città di Gravina 455-1860. (in Italian). Gravina: U. Attolini, 1922.
- Ughelli, Ferdinando; Coleti, NIccolo (1721). Italia sacra sive De episcopis Italiæ, et insularum adjacentium (in Latin). Vol. Tomus septimus (7). Venice: apud Sebastianum Coleti. pp. 112–132.
