= Roman Catholic Diocese of Urbania and Sant'Angelo in Vado =

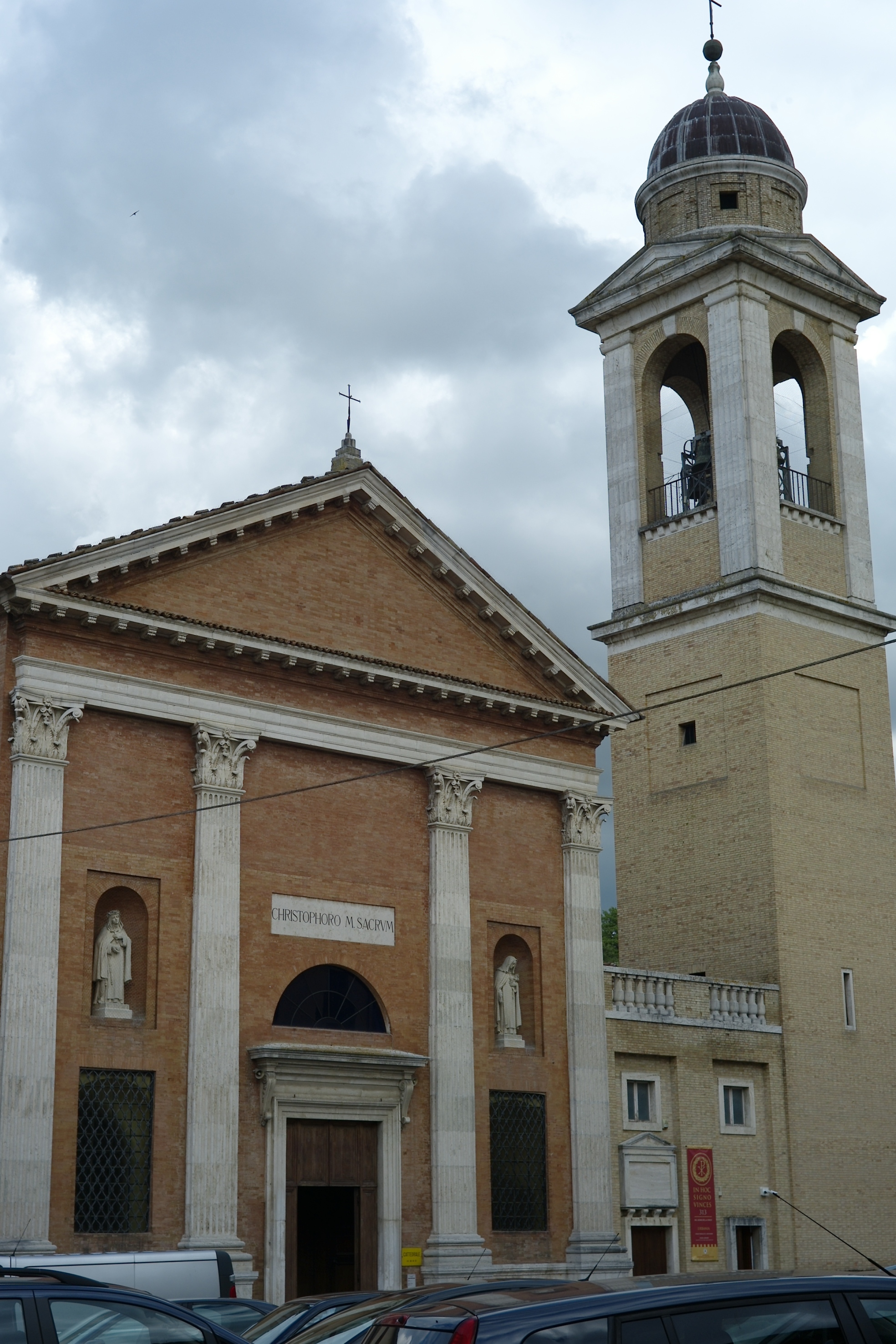
Co-Cathedral of Urbania

The former Italian Catholic Diocese of Urbania and Sant’Angelo in Vado, in the Marche, was established in 1636. In 1986, it was suppressed, and its territory united with the Archdiocese of Urbino, to form the Archdiocese of Urbino-Urbania-Sant'Angelo in Vado.

== History ==
Sant'Angelo in Vado, earlier called Tifernum Metaurense, was an ancient town, destroyed in the Gothic invasions. The survivors built a formidable castle and a church dedicated to Saint Michael. In 1635 it became a city and an episcopal see. Urbania in 1280 was demolished by the Ghibellines. It was restored again by the Dominican bishop, Guglielmo Durante and called Castel Durante; it was included in the Duchy of Urbino, and contained a magnificent ducal palace.

At the beginning of 1635 S. Angelo was an archpresbyterate nullius, subject to the Abbot of the Monastery of S. Cristoforo of Castel Durante, to whom the Archpresbyterate of Castel Durante was also subject.

In 1635 Pope Urban VIII erected the two towns into dioceses, changing the name of Castel Durante to Urbania. In the bull "In Eminenti" of 18 February 1635, he united Urbania and S. Angelo aeque principaliter, and then, on 19 September 1636, placed them under Bishop Onorato degli Onorati, who governed it for forty-eight years.

Archbishop Gian. Vincenzo Castelli, O.P. (1711) restored the cathedral of S. Cristoforo in Urbania, which had fallen into a state of near collapse. He reconsecrated the building on 24 October 1726.

=== Provincial and diocesan reorganization ===
The Second Vatican Council (1962–1965), in order to ensure that all Catholics received proper spiritual attention, decreed the reorganization of the diocesan structure of Italy and the consolidation of small and struggling dioceses. It also recommended the abolition of anomalous units such as exempt territorial prelatures.

On 18 February 1984, the Vatican and the Italian State signed a new and revised concordat. Based on the revisions, a set of Normae was issued on 15 November 1984, which was accompanied in the next year, on 3 June 1985, by enabling legislation. According to the agreement, the practice of having one bishop govern two separate dioceses at the same time, aeque personaliter, as was the case with Terni, Narni and Amelia, was to be discontinued. Instead, the Vatican continued consultations which had begun under Pope John XXIII for the merging of small dioceses, especially those with personnel and financial problems, into one combined diocese.

On 27 September 1986, Pope John Paul II approved a decree, which was published by the Congregation of Bishops on 30 September 1986. The dioceses of Urbino, Urbania, and S. Angelo in Vado, were united into one single diocese, which was named the Archdiocese of Urbino–Urbania–Sant’Angelo in Vado. The territories of the three dioceses were combined in one diocese. The cathedral of the diocese was to be in Urbino, while the cathedrals of the other two dioceses became co-cathedrals.

== Bishops of Urbania e Sant’Angelo in Vado ==
Metropolitan: Archdiocese of Urbino

- Onorato Onorati (22 Sep 1636 – Aug 1683 Resigned)
- Horatius Ondedei (1684–1688)
- Pietro Barugi (15 Nov 1688 – May 1708 Died)
- Antonio Antonelli (6 May 1709 – 17 Nov 1711 Died)
- Giovanni Vincenzo Castelli (21 Mar 1714 – Sep 1736 Died)
- Giuseppe Fabbretti (19 Nov 1736 – 18 Nov 1747 Died)
- Deodato Baiardi (18 Dec 1747 – 28 Nov 1776 Died)
- Giovanni Pergolini (17 Feb 1777 – Aug 1779 Died)
- Paol'Antonio Agostini Zamperoli (1779–1812)
- Francesco Leonini (22 Jul 1816 – 9 Apr 1822 Died)
- Francesco Tassinari (27 Sep 1824 – 27 Dec 1832 Died)
- Lorenzo Parigini (1833–1848)
- Antonio Boscarini (1849 – 3 Jun 1872)
- Giovanni Maria Majoli (1872–1893)
- Francesco Baldassarri (18 May 1894 – 15 Apr 1901 Appointed, Bishop of Imola)
- Antonio Valbonesi (15 Apr 1901 – 1906 Resigned)
- Luigi Giacomo Baccini, O.F.M.Cap. (25 Aug 1908 – 16 Jan 1935 Died)
- Giovanni Capobianco (1935–1965)
- Ugo Donato Bianchi (23 May 1977 –1986)

30 September 1986: Suppressed; its territory incorporated in the Archdiocese of Urbino-Urbania-Sant'Angelo in Vado

== Sources ==
=== Episcopal lists ===
- Gams, Pius Bonifatius (1873). Series episcoporum Ecclesiae catholicae: quotquot innotuerunt a beato Petro apostolo (in Latin). Ratisbon: Typis et Sumptibus Georgii Josephi Manz. pp. 666–667.
- Gauchat, Patritius (Patrice) (1935). Hierarchia catholica IV (1592-1667) (in Latin). Münster: Libraria Regensbergiana. p. 84.
- Ritzler, Remigius; Sefrin, Pirminus (1952). Hierarchia catholica medii et recentis aevi. Vol. 5 Tomus V (1667-1730). Patavii: Messagero di S. Antonio. p. 86.
- Ritzler, Remigius; Sefrin, Pirminus (1958). Hierarchia catholica medii et recentis aevi. Vol. 6 Tomus VI (1730-1799). Patavii: Messagero di S. Antonio. p. 86.
- Ritzler, Remigius; Sefrin, Pirminus (1968). Hierarchia Catholica medii et recentioris aevi (in Latin). Vol. VII (1800–1846). Monasterii: Libreria Regensburgiana.
- , Ritzler, Remigius; Sefrin, Pirminus (1978). Hierarchia catholica Medii et recentioris aevi (in Latin). Vol. VIII (1846–1903). Il Messaggero di S. Antonio.
- Pięta, Zenon (2002). Hierarchia catholica medii et recentioris aevi (in Latin). Vol. IX (1903–1922). Padua: Messagero di San Antonio. ISBN 978-88-250-1000-8.

=== Studies ===
- Cappelletti, Giuseppe (1845). Le chiese d'Italia (in Italian). Vol. terzo (3). Venice: G. Antonelli. pp. 411–439.
- Ughelli, Ferdinando; Coleti, Niccolò (1717). Italia sacra sive De Episcopis Italiae, et insularum adjacentium (in Latin). Vol. 2. Venice: apud Sebastianum Coleti. pp. 881–902.

==== External links ====
- "Diocese of Urbania e Sant’Angelo in Vado" Catholic-Hierarchy.org. David M. Cheney. Retrieved February 29, 2016.
- "Diocese of Sant’Angelo in Vado" GCatholic.org. Gabriel Chow. Retrieved February 29, 2016.
