= Vieste Co-cathedral =

Cathedral church in Vieste, Italy

Coordinates: 41.8816°N 16.1805°E

Vieste Cathedral (Italian: Concattedrale di Santa Maria Assunta) is a Roman Catholic co-cathedral in Vieste, a former bishopric in Apulia, southern Italy.

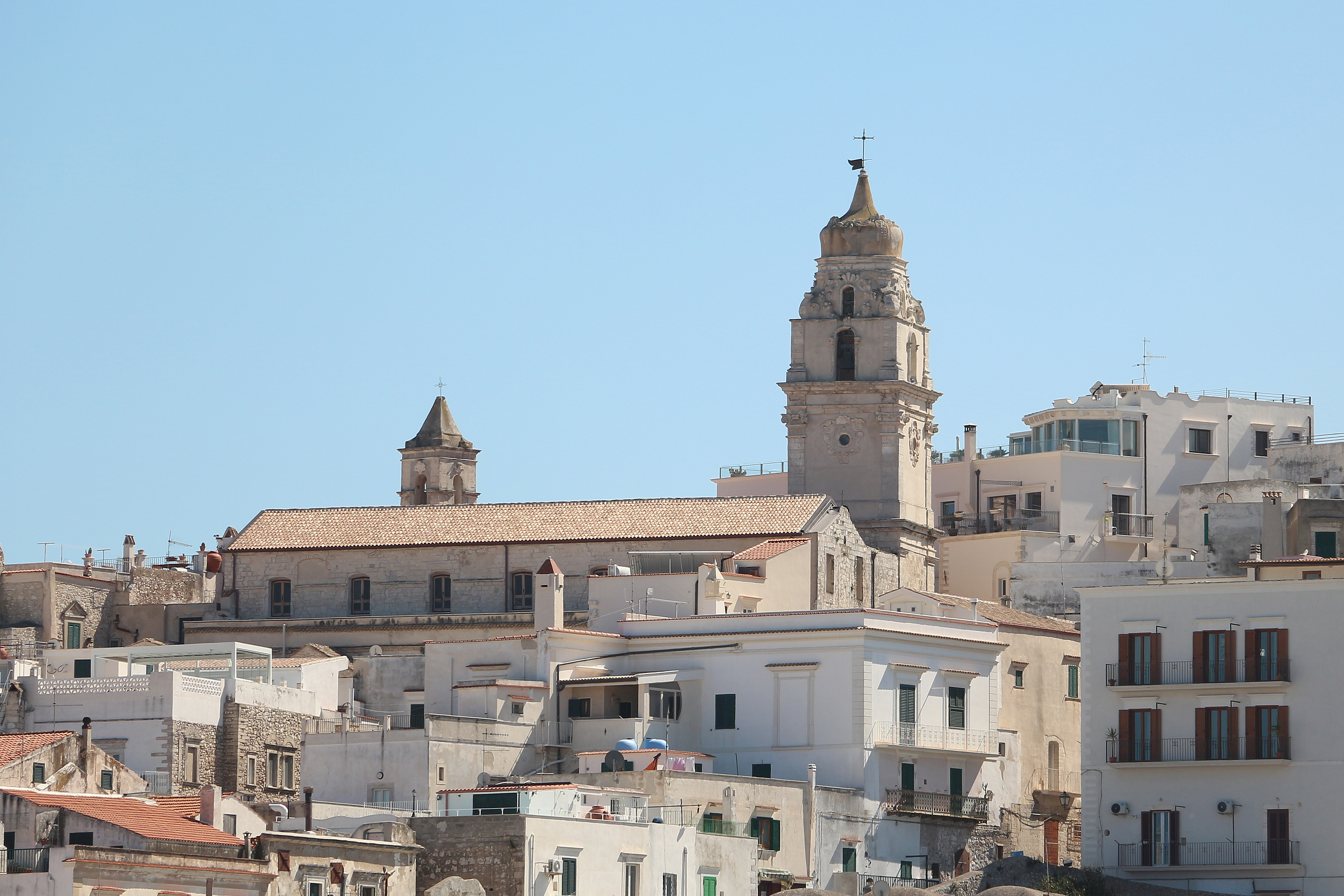
Vieste Cathedral

== History ==
It was built in Apulian Romanesque style as a cathedral when Vieste was still a Latin Catholic diocese (until its merger into the present Roman Catholic Archdiocese of Manfredonia–Vieste–San Giovanni Rotondo on 27 June 1818).

It is dedicated to the Assumption of Mary. It has a basilica plan with a nave and two aisles. Its bell tower was rebuilt in Baroque style in the 18th century after the previous one collapsed.

The co-cathedral of Viesti became a minor basilica by decree of Pope John Paul II on 12 February 1981.

== Sources and external links ==
- GCatholic, with Google satellite picture
