= Diocese of Orihuela-Alicante =

Diocese of the Catholic Church in Spain

Coordinates: 38.0857°N 0.9466°W

Diocese of Orihuela-Alicante Dioecesis Oriolensis-Lucentinus Diócesis de Orihuela-Alicante (es) Diòcesi d'Oriola-Alacant (val)

Catholic

Location
- Country: Spain
- Ecclesiastical province: Valencia

Statistics
- Area: 4,415 km^{2} (1,705 sq mi)
- Population: Total; Catholics: (as of 2019); 1 585 734; 1 169 864 (73.8%)

Information
- Denomination: Catholic Church
- Sui iuris church: Latin Church
- Rite: Roman Rite
- Cathedral: Catedral de El Salvador y Santa María, Orihuela
- Co-cathedral: Concatedral de San Nicolás, Alicante

Current leadership
- Pope: Leo XIV
- Bishop: José Ignacio Munilla Aguirre

The Diocese of Orihuela-Alicante (Latin: Dioecesis Oriolensis-Lucentinus) is a Latin Church diocese of the Catholic Church located in the cities of Orihuela and Alicante in the ecclesiastical province of Valencia in Spain. It was established as Diocese of Orihuela from the Diocese of Cartagena in 1564, obtaining its current denomination in 1959.

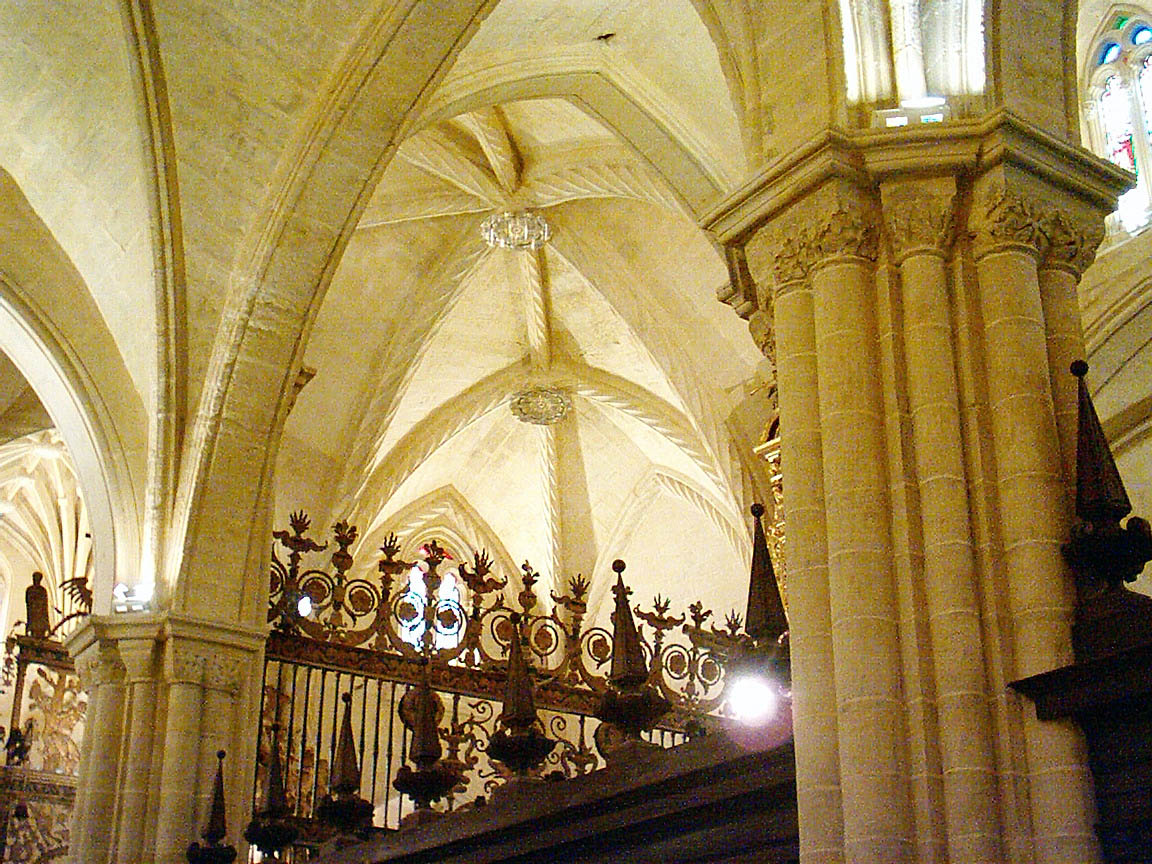
Cathedral of Orihuela.

== Leadership ==
- Gregorio Antonio Gallo de Andrade (22 Aug 1565 – 11 Sep 1577 )
- Tomás Dacio (13 Jan 1578 – 19 May 1585 )
- Cristóbal Senmanat y Robuster (17 Aug 1587 – 9 Nov 1593 )
- José Esteve Juan (12 Jan 1594 – 2 Nov 1603)
- Andrés Balaguer Salvador, O.P. (10 Nov 1604 – 11 Apr 1626 )
- Bernardo Caballero Paredes (22 Mar 1627 – 13 Aug 1635 )
- Juan García Arlés (7 Jan 1636 – 23 Mar 1644 )
- Félix Guzmán, O.P. (14 Nov 1644 – 1 Mar 1646 )
- Juan Orta Moreno (19 Nov 1646 – 5 Nov 1690 )
- José de la Torre Orumbela (3 Oct 1701 – 6 Jan 1712 )
- José Espejo Cisneros (28 May 1714 – 2 Jul 1717 )
- Salvador Rodríguez Castelblanco, T.O.R. (22 Nov 1717 – 20 Jun 1727 )
- José Flores Osorio (22 Dec 1727 – 3 Mar 1738 )
- Juan Elías Gómez Terán (5 May 1738 – 9 Oct 1758 )
- Pedro Albornoz Tapia (15 Dec 1760 – 22 Jan 1767 )
- José Tormo Juliá (1 Jun 1768 – 26 Nov 1790 Died)
- Antonio Despuig y Dameto (26 Sep 1791 – 1 Feb 1794 )
- Francisco Javier Cabrera Velasco (1 Jun 1795 – 24 Jul 1797 )
- Francisco Antonio Cebrián y Valdá (23 Jul 1797 – 10 Jul 1815 )
- Simón López García, C.O. (18 Dec 1815 – 27 Sep 1824 )
- Félix Herrero Valverde (27 Jun 1824 – 29 Mar 1858 )
- Pedro María Cubero López de Padilla (27 Sep 1858 – 10 Nov 1881 )
- Victoriano Guisasola y Rodríguez (27 Mar 1882 – 10 Jun 1886 )
- Juan Maura y Gelabert (10 Jun 1886 – 24 Jan 1910 )
- Ramón Plaza y Blanco (18 Jul 1913 – 8 Nov 1921 )
- Francisco Javier de Irastorza Loinaz (27 Jun 1922 – 29 Dec 1943 )
- José García y Goldaraz (10 Aug 1944 – 25 Aug 1953 )
- Pablo Barrachina Estevan (31 Mar 1954 – 12 May 1989 )
- Francisco Alvarez Martínez (12 May 1989 – 23 Jun 1995 )
- Victorio Oliver Domingo (22 Feb 1996 – 26 Nov 2005 )
- Rafael Palmero Ramos (26 Nov 2005 – 27 Jul 2012)
- Jesús Murgui Soriano (27 Jul 2012 – 7 Dec 2021)
- José Ignacio Munilla Aguirre (7 Dec 2021 – )

== See also ==
- History of Alicante
- Timeline of Alicante
- Catholic Church in Spain

== Sources ==
- GCatholic.org
- Catholic Hierarchy
- Diocese website
- Alicante's Catholic Cathedral website
