= Roberto Caracciolo =

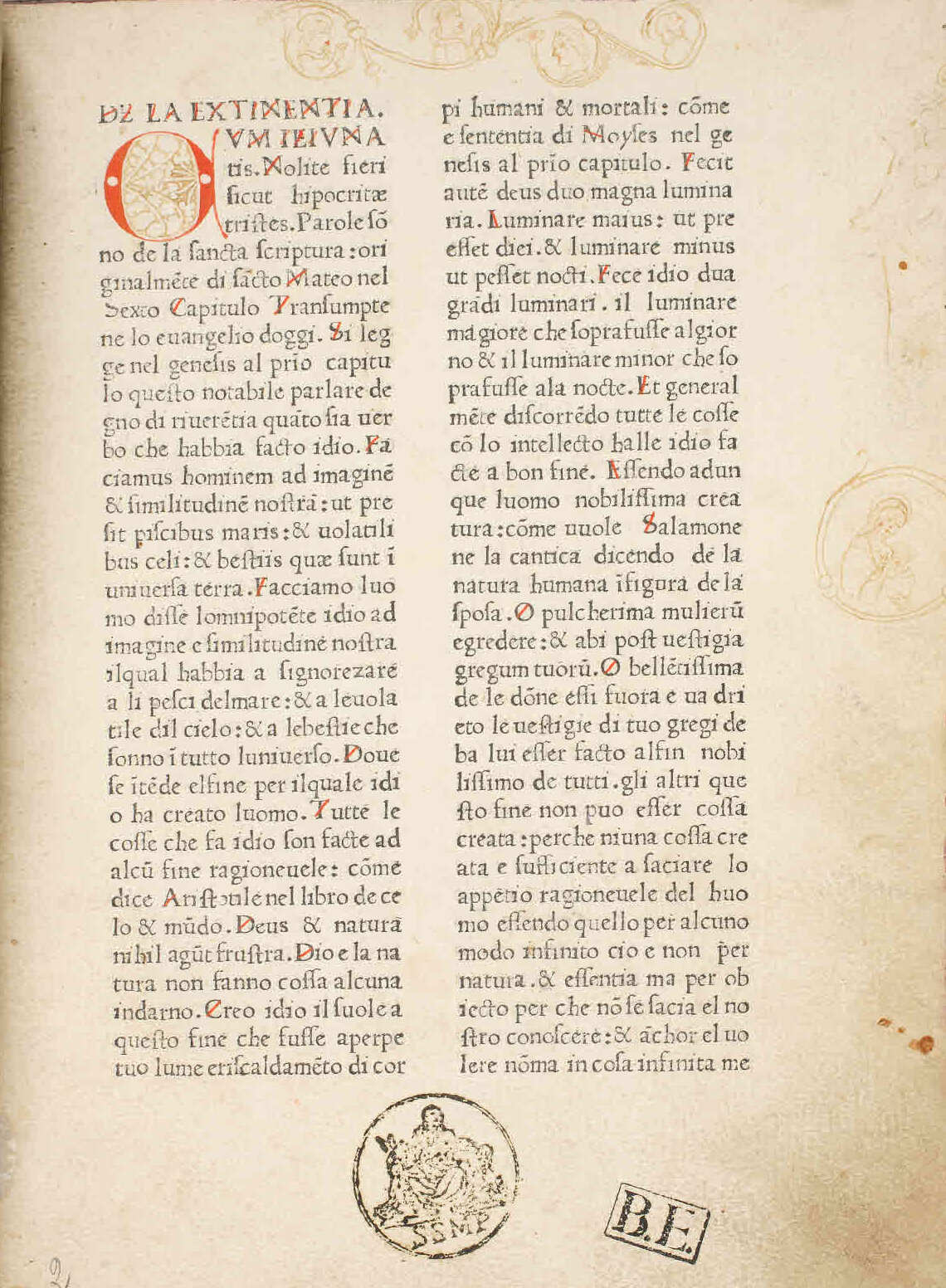
Sermones quadragesimales, 1475

Roberto Caracciolo of Lecce (c.1425 – 6 May 1495) was a Franciscan friar, one of the most famous Italian preachers of his time.

== Works ==
- Sermones quadragesimales (in Italian). Milan: Domenico da Vespolate. 1475.
- Sermones quadragesimales (in Italian). Treviso: Michele Manzolo. 1480.
- Specchio della fede (in Italian). Venice: Giovanni da Bergamo. 1495.
