= Abbiati =

Abbiati is a surname, from the Lombardy region (suffix -ati), found in Milan. Notable people with the surname include:

- Christian Abbiati (born 1977), Italian former professional footballer
- Filippo Abbiati (1640–1715), Italian painter of Baroque style
- Francesco Maria Abbiati (died 1650), Roman Catholic prelate
- Franco Abbiati (1898–1981), Italian musicologist
- Giuseppe Abbiati, Italian engraver
- Paolo Maria Abbiati (17th century), Italian engraver

== See also ==
- Abbiategrasso, a comune in the province of Milan
