= Moore Catholic High School =

Location
- 100 Merrill Avenue; Staten Island, New York 10314; United States; 40°36′35″N 74°9′52″W

Information
- Former name: Countess Moore High School (until 1978)
- Type: Catholic
- Religious affiliation: Roman Catholic
- Established: 1962 (64 years ago)
- Founder: Roman Catholic Archdiocese of New York; Presentation Sisters of Staten Island
- Principal: Scott Gabel
- Chaplain: Father Rhey Garcia
- Grades: 9–12
- Gender: Girls until 1969; Coeducational from 1969
- Average class size: 25
- Education system: ADNY
- Campus size: 6 acres (24,000 m^{2})
- Colors: Red and black
- Mascot: Maverick
- Team name: Mavericks
- Accreditation: Middle States Association of Colleges and Schools
- Tuition: $9,680
- Website: moorecatholichs.org

Moore Catholic High School is an American private, Catholic school in the Bulls Head neighborhood of Staten Island, New York. It was founded by the Presentation Sisters of Staten Island in September 1962 and named for Mary Young Moore, a beneficiary to the Roman Catholic Archdiocese of New York, and was the first archdiocesan high school for girls on Staten Island.

Moore became co-educational in September 1969, and the name was formally changed from Countess Moore High School to Moore Catholic High School in October 1978.

Enrollment is about 400 students, evenly divided between boys and girls.

== Advanced academics ==
In 2005, Moore initiated a program called Presentation Scholars Academy(PSA) for gifted students. The students are challenged and take accelerated, college-level, and Advanced Placement classes. The school also has a partnership with St. John's University, a large Catholic university that gives academic credit to Moore students for college-level extension courses.

== Clubs ==
School clubs include National Honor Society, Student Council, The Game Club, Teaching the Christian Message, Yearbook, International Club, Interact Club, Art Club, and The Design Club.

== Electives ==
Senior Electives: Creative Writing, American Sign Language, Theology, Sociology, Psychology, Statistics, Criminal Justice, Immunology, AP Calculus, AP English, AP US History, AP Biology, Digital Art, Studio Art, AP Physics, and AP Computer Science A.

== Events ==
The school has several annual events: Freshman Field Day, Senior Costume Day, Junior Prom, Senior Prom, Hall of Fame Dinner and Golf Outing, Performing Arts Dinner Cabaret, Coaches for Cancer Basketball Tournament, Fall play, Christmas Spectacular and Spring musical, Dance and Music Recitals.

== Athletics ==
Moore Catholic offers basketball, baseball, softball, lacrosse, soccer, co-ed cheerleading, bowling, golf, and track and field.

The Integrated Athletic Initiative does sports for children with autism and other disabilities at Moore Catholic.

== Faculty ==
Moore Catholic is staffed by the Daughters of Our Lady of the Garden, and dedicated lay faculty and staff. 28 member faculty hold 22 advanced degrees.

== Notable alumni ==
- Yancey Arias, actor
- Kathy Brier, actress
- Jennifer Esposito, actress & ex-spouse of (Bradley Cooper)
- Vidal Hazelton, football wide receiver
- Shea Spitzbarth, baseball player
