= Gasparo Cecchinelli =

Roman Catholic prelate (1587–1666)

Most Reverend Gasparo Cecchinelli
- Bishop of Corneto e Montefiascone
- Church: Catholic Church
- Diocese: Diocese of Corneto e Montefiascone
- In office: 1630 – 7 March 1666
- Predecessor: Laudivio Zacchia
- Successor: Paluzzo Paluzzi Altieri Degli Albertoni
- Previous post: Apostolic Nuncio to Savoy (1641–1644)

Orders
- Consecration: 20 May 1630 by Laudivio Zacchia

Personal details
- Born: 1587 Sarzana, Genoa
- Died: 7 March 1666 (aged 78–79)

Gasparo Cecchinelli (1587 – 7 March 1666) was a Roman Catholic prelate who served as Bishop of Corneto e Montefiascone (1630–1666) and Apostolic Nuncio to Savoy (1641–1644).

== Biography ==
Gasparo Cecchinelli was born in Sarzana, Genoa in 1587.

On 13 May 1630, he was appointed by Pope Urban VIII as Bishop of Corneto e Montefiascone. The diocese had previously been held by his uncle, Cardinal Paolo Emilio Zacchia, and then by his uncle Cardinal Laudivio Zacchia (1605–1630). During the tenure of the diocese by Laudivio Zacchia, Cecchinelli served as his Vicar General in diocesan administration. On 20 May 1630, he was consecrated bishop by Laudivio Zacchia, Cardinal-Priest of San Pietro in Vincoli. The two cardinals and their nephew were responsible for the building of the façade of the cathedral of Montefiascone.

On 4 May 1641, he was appointed by Pope Urban VIII as Apostolic Nuncio to Savoy. He resigned as Apostolic Nuncio to Savoy in April 1644.

He served as Bishop of Corneto e Montefiascone until his death on 7 March 1666. It is said that he was unsteady in his administration of justice, proceeding arbitrarily and without regard to process.

== Episcopal succession ==
While bishop, he was the principal co-consecrator of:

- Raffaele Pizzorno, Bishop of Sagone (1640); and
- Alessandro Porro, Bishop of Bobbio (1650).

== External links and additional sources ==
- Cheney, David M. "Nunciature to Savoy". Catholic-Hierarchy.org. (for Chronology of Bishops) ^{[self-published]}
- Cheney, David M. "Diocese of Montefiascone". Catholic-Hierarchy.org. (for Chronology of Bishops) ^{[self-published]}
- Chow, Gabriel. "Titular Episcopal See of Montefiascone (Italy)". GCatholic.org. (for Chronology of Bishops) ^{[self-published]}

Catholic Church titles
Preceded by Fausto Caffarelli	Apostolic Nuncio to Savoy; 1641 – April 1644	Succeeded by Giovanni Battista Landi
Preceded by Laudivio Zacchia	Bishop of Corneto e Montefiascone; 1630 – 7 March 1666	Succeeded by Paluzzo Paluzzi Altieri Degli Albertoni
