= Benedetto Ubaldi =

17th-century Catholic cardinal

His Eminence Benedetto Ubaldi
- Cardinal-Deacon of Santi Vito, Modesto e Crescenzia
- Church: Catholic Church

Orders
- Consecration: 23 Apr 1634 by Antonio Marcello Barberini

Personal details
- Born: 1588 Perugia, Italy
- Died: 18 Jan 1644 (age 56)

Benedetto Ubaldi (1588–1644), or Benedetto Monaldi, was a Roman Catholic cardinal.

== Biography ==
Benedetto was the son of Mario Monaldi and Zenobia Ubaldi. His brother was Orazio Monaldi, Bishop of Gubbio (1639–1643) and then of Perugia. His tombstone in Perugia calls him Benedictus Monaldi. He was also called Benedetto Monaldi Baldeschi. He was educated at Rome under the tutelage of his maternal uncle, Francesco Ubaldi Baldeschi, Auditor of the Roman Rota. He so impressed his uncle that Baldeschi made him his heir, from which he derived the name Benedetto Monaldi Baldeschi.

He studied literature in Perugia at the seminary and the College of S. Bernardo, under Alfonso Alessandri and Marco Antonio Bonciario. He then studied law at the University of Perugia. When his uncle was appointed to the chair in law at the University of Avignon in 1608, Benedetto accompanied him and spent two years studying in Avignon. He obtained his degree in Perugia in 1611. He then joined his uncle in Rome, where Baldeschi had been appointed Auditor of the Roman Rota. Benedetto spent more than six years as a lawyer and student of law in Rome. His reputation grew to such an extent that the College of Advocates of Perugia elected him a member of their body on 27 March 1626. In 1626 Pope Urban VIII appointed him to a vacant post as Auditor of the Rota. He took part in the discussions of the Rota for the first time on 27 November 1626. In 1637, fifty-one of his decisions as Auditor were published.

In 1628, Monaldi was sent by Pope Urban to assist his nephew, Cardinal Antonio Barberini, during his Legation in Lombardy, serving as the Cardinal's Auditor and Datary. He served again when the Cardinal was sent as Legate to Urbino in 1630. These missions brought him as close as possible to the centers of power and favor.

=== Cardinal ===
On 28 November 1633, Pope Urban VIII named Benedetto Monaldi Baldeschi a cardinal, and on 9 January 1634 he was assigned the Deaconry of Ss. Vito e Modesto. He was usually referred to as Cardinal Ubaldi.

In February 1634 he was named Cardinal Legate in Bologna. Following his appointment as bishop, he served as Legate until 1637.

On 2 April 1634 Monaldi Baldeschi was appointed Bishop of Perugia by Urban VIII. On 23 Apr 1634, he was consecrated bishop by Antonio Marcello Barberini, Cardinal-Priest of Sant'Onofrio, with Faustus Poli, Titular Archbishop of Amasea, and Celso Zani, Bishop Emeritus of Città della Pieve, serving as co-consecrators. To govern his diocese of Perugia while he was absent as Legate in Bologna, he appointed his brother Orazio Monaldi as his Vicar General. He did not make his own solemn entry into the diocese until 18 July 1637, and he departed for Rome in November, not returning until Lent of 1638. On his return, he summoned and presided over a diocesan synod.

While bishop, he was the principal consecrator of Paolo Pellegrini, Bishop of Capri (1641). He resigned the diocese of Perugia in favor of his brother Orazio Monaldi on 14 December 1643.

Cardinal Monaldi died in Perugia on 20 January 1644, at the age of fifty-six, only thirty-five days after his resignation of the diocese of Perugia. He was buried in the family chapel in the Church of S. Maria Nuova dei Servi.

== Sources ==
- Cardella, Lorenzo (1793). Memorie storiche de' cardinali della Santa Romana Chiesa. Vol. VI. Rome: Pagliarini, 1793 pp. 316–319. (in Latin)
- Ciaconius (Chacon), Alphonsus (Alfonso) (1677). Augustus Oldoin(us) (ed.). Vitae et res Gestae Pontificvm Romanorvm et S.R.E. Cardinalivm Ab Initio Nascentis Ecclesiae Vsque ad Clementem IX. P.O.M. (in Latin). Vol. Tomus quartus (second ed.). Rome: De Rossi (de Rubeis). p. 596.
- Gauchat, Patritius (Patrice) (1935). Hierarchia catholica. Vol. Tomus IV (1592-1667). Münster: Libraria Regensbergiana.
- Mariotti, Annibale (1788). De' perugini auditori della Sacra Rota Romana memorie istoriche (in Italian). Perugia: presso Carlo Baduel. pp. 147–160, 218.
- Vermiglioli, Giovanni Battista (1828). Biografia degli scrittori perugini e notizie delle opere loro (in Italian). Vol. Tomo primo (ACE-BAL). Perugia: V. Bartelli e G. Costantini. p. 146.
- Vincioli, Giacinto (1730). Notizie istorico-critiche a'ritratti di 24 Cardinali Perugini colla serie dopo il decimoquarto cronologica de'vescovi e disamina de'due santi Ercolani (in Italian). Foligno: Campana stampat. Vesc. pp. 188–191.

Catholic Church titles
Preceded by Lelio Biscia	Cardinal-Deacon of Santi Vito, Modesto e Crescenzia; 1634–1644	Succeeded by Federico Sforza
Preceded by Cosimo de Torres	Bishop of Perugia; 1634–1643	Succeeded by Orazio Monaldi
