= Rebiba =

Rebiba is an Italian surname. Notable people with this surname include:

- Giovanni Domenico Rebiba (died 1604), Italian Roman Catholic bishop of Ortona (1570–1595) and then of Catania
- Prospero Rebiba (died 1593), Italian Roman Catholic Titular Patriarch of Constantinople (1573–1593)
- Scipione Rebiba (1504–1577), Italian cardinal of the Catholic Church
