= Alessandro Porro =

1xth-century Roman Catholic bishop

Most Reverend Alessandro Porro
- Bishop of Bobbio
- Church: Catholic Church
- Diocese: Diocese of Bobbio
- In office: 1650–1660
- Predecessor: Francesco Maria Abbiati
- Successor: Bartolomeo Capra

Orders
- Consecration: 21 Dec 1650 by Marcantonio Franciotti

Personal details
- Born: 1600 Milan, Italy
- Died: 15 Sep 1660 (age 60)

Alessandro Porro, C.R. (1600–1660) was a Roman Catholic prelate who served as Bishop of Bobbio (1650–1660).

== Biography ==
Alessandro Porro was born in 1600 in Milan, Italy and ordained a priest in the Congregation of Clerics Regular of the Divine Providence. On 5 Dec 1650, he was appointed during the papacy of Pope Innocent X as Bishop of Bobbio. On 21 Dec 1650, he was consecrated bishop by Marcantonio Franciotti, Cardinal-Priest of Santa Maria della Pace, with Gasparo Cecchinelli, Bishop of Corneto e Montefiascone, and Giovanni Tommaso Pinelli, Bishop of Molfetta, serving as co-consecrators. He served as Bishop of Bobbio until his death on 15 Sep 1660.

== External links and additional sources ==
- Cheney, David M. "Diocese of Bobbio (-Abbey of San Colombano)". Catholic-Hierarchy.org. (for Chronology of Bishops) ^{[self-published]}
- Chow, Gabriel. "Diocese of Bobbio–San Colombano (Italy)". GCatholic.org. (for Chronology of Bishops) ^{[self-published]}

Catholic Church titles
Preceded by Francesco Maria Abbiati	Bishop of Bobbio; 1650–1660	Succeeded by Bartolomeo Capra
