= Francesco Antonio Biondo =

Italian Roman Catholic prelate

Most Reverend Francesco Antonio Biondo
- Bishop of Ortona a Mare e Campli
- Church: Catholic Church
- Diocese: Diocese of Ortona a Mare e Campli
- In office: 1640–1643
- Predecessor: Antimo degli Atti
- Successor: Alessandro Crescenzi (cardinal)
- Previous post: Bishop of Capri (1637–1640)

Orders
- Consecration: 3 January 1638 by Marcello Lante della Rovere

Personal details
- Died: 21 December 1643

Francesco Antonio Biondo, O.F.M. Conv. (died 21 December 1643) was a Roman Catholic prelate who served as Bishop of Ortona a Mare e Campli (1640–1643) and Bishop of Capri (1637–1640).

== Biography ==
Francesco Antonio Biondo was ordained a priest in the Order of Friars Minor Conventual. On 14 December 1637, he was appointed during the papacy of Pope Urban VIII as Bishop of Capri. On 3 January 1638, he was consecrated bishop by Marcello Lante della Rovere, Cardinal-Bishop of Frascati, with Francesco Maria Abbiati, Bishop of Bobbio, and Pomponio Vetuli, Bishop of Città Ducale, serving as co-consecrators. On 3 December 1640, he was appointed during the papacy of Pope Urban VIII as Bishop of Ortona a Mare e Campli. He served as Bishop of Ortona a Mare e Campli until his death on 21 December 1643.

== See also ==
- Catholic Church in Italy

== External links and additional sources ==
- Cheney, David M. "Diocese of Capri". Catholic-Hierarchy.org. (for Chronology of Bishops) ^{[self-published]}
- Chow, Gabriel. "Titular Episcopal See of Capri (Italy)". GCatholic.org. (for Chronology of Bishops) ^{[self-published]}
- Cheney, David M. "Diocese of Ortona a Mare e Campli". Catholic-Hierarchy.org. (for Chronology of Bishops) ^{[self-published]}
- Chow, Gabriel. "Diocese of Ortona (Italy)". GCatholic.org. (for Chronology of Bishops) ^{[self-published]}

Catholic Church titles
Preceded by Alessandro Sibilia	Bishop of Capri; 1637–1640	Succeeded by Paolo Pellegrini
Preceded by Antimo degli Atti	Bishop of Ortona a Mare e Campli; 1640–1643	Succeeded by Alessandro Crescenzi (cardinal)
