= Paolo Pellegrini =

Bishop of Capri from 1641 to 1683

Most Reverend Paolo Pellegrini
- Bishop of Capri
- Church: Catholic Church
- Diocese: Diocese of Capri
- In office: 1641–1683
- Predecessor: Francesco Antonio Biondo
- Successor: Dionisio Petra

Orders
- Consecration: 2 April 1641

Personal details
- Born: 1597 Naples, Italy
- Died: April 1683 (age 86) Capri, Italy

Paolo Pellegrini (1597 – April 1683) was a Roman Catholic prelate who served as Bishop of Capri (1641–1683).

== Biography ==
Paolo Pellegrini was born in Naples, Italy in 1597. On 18 March 1641, he was appointed during the papacy of Pope Urban VIII as Bishop of Capri. On 2 April 1641, he was consecrated bishop by Benedetto Ubaldi, Cardinal-Deacon of Santi Vito, Modesto e Crescenzia, with Luigi Leonardo Mocenigo, Archbishop of Candia, and Filippo Cansacchi, Bishop of Gravina di Puglia, serving as co-consecrators. He served as Bishop of Capri until his death in April 1683.

== External links and additional sources ==
- Cheney, David M. "Diocese of Capri". Catholic-Hierarchy.org. (for Chronology of Bishops)
- Chow, Gabriel. "Titular Episcopal See of Capri (Italy)". GCatholic.org. (for Chronology of Bishops)

Catholic Church titles
Preceded by Francesco Antonio Biondo	Bishop of Capri; 1641–1683	Succeeded by Dionisio Petra
