= Alessandro Sibilia =

17th-century Roman Catholic bishop

Most Reverend Alessandro Sibilia
- Bishop of Capri
- Church: Catholic Church
- Diocese: Diocese of Capri
- In office: 1637
- Predecessor: Loreto Di Franco
- Successor: Francesco Antonio Biondo

Orders
- Consecration: 1 May 1637 by Giovanni Battista Scanaroli

Personal details
- Born: 1591 Capua, Italy
- Died: June 1637 (aged 45–46)

Alessandro Sibilia (1591–1637) was a Roman Catholic prelate who served as Bishop of Capri (1637).

== Biography ==
Alessandro Sibilia was born in 1591 in Capua, Italy. On 20 Apr 1637, he was appointed during the papacy of Pope Urban VIII as Bishop of Capri. On 1 May 1637, he was consecrated bishop by Giovanni Battista Scanaroli, Titular Bishop of Sidon, with Clemente Confetti, Bishop of Muro Lucano, and Tommaso Carafa, Bishop of Vulturara e Montecorvino, serving as co-consecrators. He served as Bishop of Capri until his death in June 1637.

== External links and additional sources ==
- Cheney, David M. "Diocese of Capri". Catholic-Hierarchy.org. (for Chronology of Bishops) ^{[self-published]}
- Chow, Gabriel. "Titular Episcopal See of Capri (Italy)". GCatholic.org. (for Chronology of Bishops) ^{[self-published]}

Catholic Church titles
Preceded by Loreto Di Franco	Bishop of Capri; 1637	Succeeded by Francesco Antonio Biondo
