= Dionisio Petra =

Most Reverend Dionisio Petra
- Bishop of Capri
- Church: Catholic Church
- Diocese: Diocese of Capri
- Predecessor: Paolo Pellegrini
- Successor: Michele Gallo Vandeinde

Personal details
- Born: 1630 Vasto Girardi, Italy
- Died: June 1698 (age 68) Capri, Italy

Dionisio Petra, O.S.B. (1630 – June 1698) was a Roman Catholic prelate who served as Bishop of Capri (1683–1698).

== Biography ==
Dionisio Petra was born in Vasto Girardi, Italy in 1630 and ordained a priest in the Order of Saint Benedict. On 12 July 1683, he was appointed during the papacy of Pope Innocent XI as Bishop of Capri. He served as Bishop of Capri until his death in June 1698.

== External links and additional sources ==
- Cheney, David M. "Diocese of Capri". Catholic-Hierarchy.org. (for Chronology of Bishops) ^{[self-published]}
- Chow, Gabriel. "Titular Episcopal See of Capri (Italy)". GCatholic.org. (for Chronology of Bishops) ^{[self-published]}

Catholic Church titles
Preceded by Paolo Pellegrini	Bishop of Capri; 1683–1698	Succeeded by Michele Gallo Vandeinde
