= Michele Gallo Vandeinde =

Roman catholic prelate

Most Reverend Michele Gallo Vandeinde
- Bishop of Capri
- Church: Catholic Church
- Diocese: Diocese of Capri
- Predecessor: Dionisio Petra
- Successor: Giovanni Maria de Laurentiis

Orders
- Ordination: 11 March 1690
- Consecration: 21 September 1698 by Pier Matteo Petrucci

Personal details
- Born: 4 January 1661 Naples, Italy
- Died: Unknown

Michele Gallo Vandeinde (born 4 January 1661) was a Roman Catholic prelate who served as Bishop of Capri (1698–1727).

== Biography ==
Michele Gallo Vandeinde was born in Naples, Italy on 4 January 1661. He was ordained a deacon on 17 December 1689 and ordained a priest on 11 March 1690. On 15 September 1698, he was appointed during the papacy of Pope Innocent XII as Bishop of Capri. On 21 September 1698, he was consecrated bishop by Pier Matteo Petrucci, Cardinal-Priest of San Marcello, with Francesco Pannocchieschi d'Elci, Archbishop of Pisa, and Domenico Belisario de Bellis, Bishop of Molfetta, with serving as co-consecrators. He served as Bishop of Capri until his resignation on 18 December 1727.

== External links and additional sources ==
- Cheney, David M. "Diocese of Capri". Catholic-Hierarchy.org. (for Chronology of Bishops) ^{[self-published]}
- Chow, Gabriel. "Titular Episcopal See of Capri (Italy)". GCatholic.org. (for Chronology of Bishops) ^{[self-published]}

Catholic Church titles
Preceded by Dionisio Petra	Bishop of Capri; 1698–1727	Succeeded by Giovanni Maria de Laurentiis
