= Girolamo Bentivoglio =

Roman Catholic Bishop of Corneto (1580-1601)

Most Reverend Girolamo Bentivoglio
- Bishop of Corneto (Tarquinia) e Montefiascone
- Church: Catholic Church
- Diocese: Diocese of Corneto (Tarquinia) e Montefiascone)
- In office: 7 October 1580 – 12 April 1601
- Predecessor: Vincenzo Fucheri
- Successor: Paolo Emilio Zacchia

Orders
- Consecration: 13 November 1580 by Giulio Antonio Santorio

Personal details
- Died: 12 April 1601

Girolamo Bentivoglio (fl. 1580 – 12 April 1601) was a Roman Catholic prelate who served as Bishop of Corneto (Tarquinia) e Montefiascone (1580–1601).

== Biography ==
On 7 October 1580, Girolamo Bentivoglio was appointed during the papacy of Pope Gregory XIII as Bishop of Corneto (Tarquinia) e Montefiascone. On 13 November 1580, he was consecrated bishop by Giulio Antonio Santorio, Cardinal-Priest of San Bartolomeo all'Isola, with Thomas Goldwell, Bishop of Saint Asaph, and Filippo Spinola, Bishop of Nola, serving as co-consecrators. He served as Bishop of Corneto (Tarquinia) e Montefiascone until his death on 12 April 1601.

== See also ==
- Catholic Church in Italy

== External links and additional sources ==
- Cheney, David M. "Diocese of Montefiascone". Catholic-Hierarchy.org. (for Chronology of Bishops) ^{[self-published]}
- Chow, Gabriel. "Titular Episcopal See of Montefiascone (Italy)". GCatholic.org. (for Chronology of Bishops) ^{[self-published]}

Catholic Church titles
| Preceded by Vincenzo Fucheri | Bishop of Corneto (Tarquinia) e Montefiascone; 1580–1601 | Succeeded by Paolo Emilio Zacchia |
