= Vidal Hazelton =

American gridiron football player (born 1988)

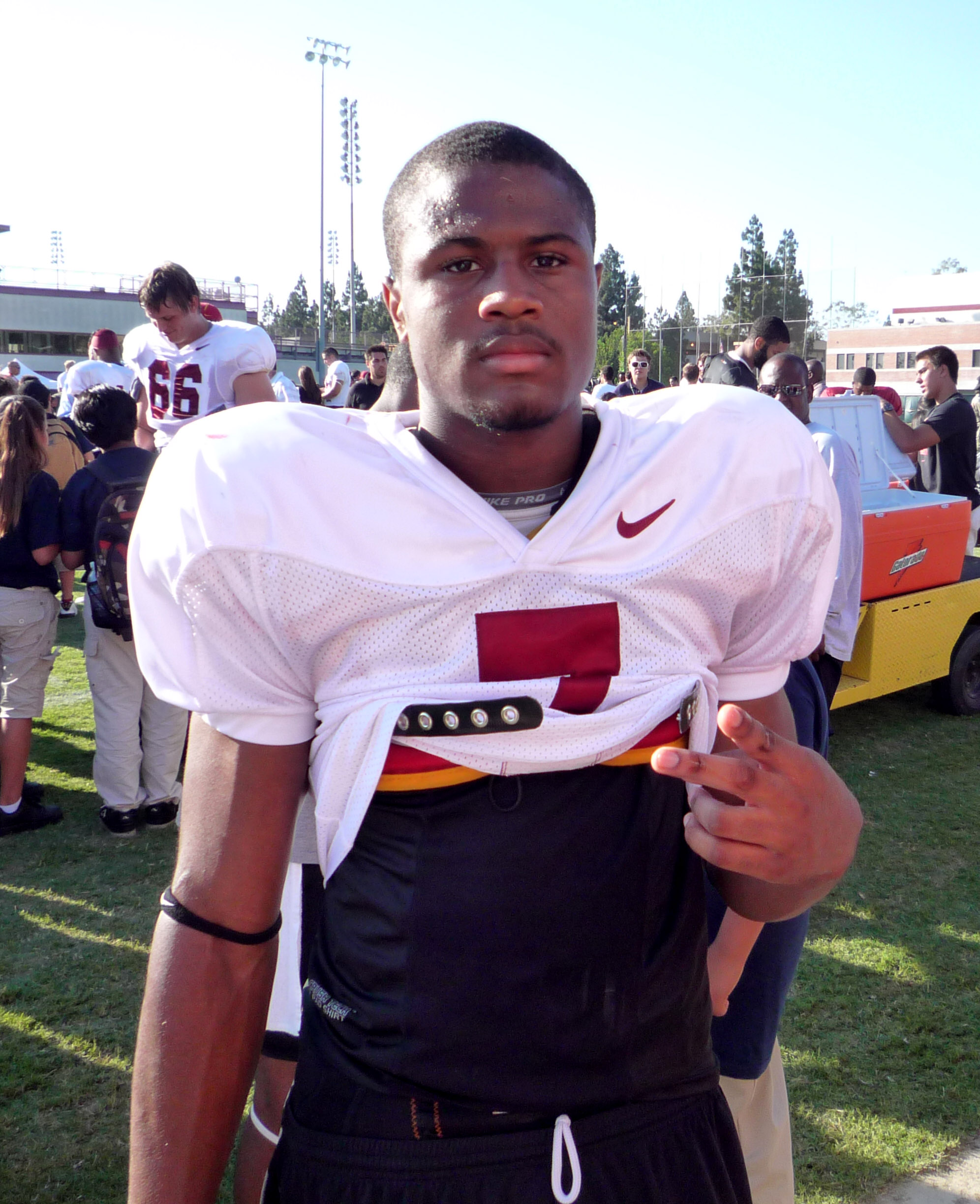
- Hazelton after a 2008 USC fall practice

No. 17
- Position: Wide receiver

Personal information
- Born: January 29, 1988 (age 38); New York, New York, U.S.
- Listed height: 6 ft 2 in (1.88 m)
- Listed weight: 220 lb (100 kg)

Career information
- High school: Staten Island (NY) Moore
- College: USC; Cincinnati
- NFL draft: 2011: undrafted

Career history
- San Diego Chargers (2011)*; Cincinnati Bengals (2011–2012)*; Tennessee Titans (2012)*; Cincinnati Bengals 2012*; New York Jets (2013); Boston Brawlers (2014); Toronto Argonauts (2015–2016); Edmonton Eskimos (2016–2018)
- * Offseason or practice squad member only

Awards and highlights
- Frank M. Gibson Trophy (2015)

Career CFL statistics
- Receptions: 139
- Receiving yards: 1,724
- Receiving average: 12.4
- Receiving touchdowns: 13
- Stats at CFL.ca
- Stats at Pro Football Reference

Vidal Hazelton (born January 29, 1988) is an American former professional football wide receiver. He was signed by the San Diego Chargers as an undrafted free agent in 2011. He played college football for the USC Trojans and the Cincinnati Bearcats.

== Early life ==
As a junior in 2005 at Moore Catholic High School in Staten Island (N.Y.), he caught 39 passes for 784 yards (20.1 avg.) with 17 TDs, ran for 240 yards with 4 scores and posted 38 tackles, 3 sacks and 2 interceptions for TDs. During the previous fall, Hazelton briefly transferred to Ralph R. McKee CTE High School where he was to be paired with rising star Wide Receiver, Benjamin Little, and All City Linebacker, Kofi Antwi. Little’s decision to quit the M.S.I.T football program prompted an immediate return to Moore for Hazelton. He eventually transferred to Hargrave Military Academy his senior year, where he had 41 receptions for 942 yards (23.0 avg.) with 13 TDs in 2005. Hazelton was invited to play in the 2006 U.S. Army All-American Bowl, a national all-star game for the best high school football players in the country.

== College career ==
=== USC ===
Hazelton arrived at USC as one of the nation's best players and one of USC's biggest pickups of the recruiting season. Hazelton saw time in only two games his freshman season, as the Trojans ended up going 11–2 and winning the 2007 Rose Bowl against Michigan 32–18. Hazelton played backup to Dwayne Jarrett and Steve Smith, two of the best receivers in the nation, and only accumulated one catch for eight yards. He also had a run for seven yards.

Hazelton was expected to start the 2007 season for the Trojans, along with junior Patrick Turner, and in spring practice Hazelton impressed observers. He entered fall camp as the top starting flanker on the depth chart. Vidal made an outstanding one handed touchdown catch against Idaho in USC's first game of the year. He finished the season as USC's leading wide receiver in 2007, catching 50 passes and scored four touchdowns.

Hazelton's 2008 season with USC was not as successful. After catching five passes, he suffered a high ankle sprain in the season opener against Virginia. Once he recovered he found himself unable to climb back into the starting line-up. The arrival and rise of Arkansas transfer Damian Williams, along with continued production by senior Patrick Turner and sophomore Ronald Johnson, pushed Hazelton into the role of a seldom used reserve. Further complicating matters, Hazelton's grandfather was diagnosed with cancer, and he desired to be geographically closer to him. On December 2, 2008, Hazelton asked for and was granted permission to transfer to another school. After leaving, Hazelton noted "USC is a great place. It's filled up with athletes. If somebody's not 100 percent they've got to pass them up. I would have done the same thing if I was the coaches at USC." Although Hazelton was from New York, he lived most recently with his grandfather in Georgia. By mid-January, Hazelton was leaning towards Cincinnati.

== Professional career ==
=== Cincinnati Bengals ===
After going undrafted in the 2011 NFL draft, Hazelton was signed by the San Diego Chargers on July 26, 2011. He was waived by San Diego on August 30. He later signed with the Cincinnati Bengals practice squad on December 27, 2011. He was waived by the Cincinnati Bengals on August 31, 2012.

=== Tennessee Titans ===
Hazelton signed with the Tennessee Titans practice squad September 3, 2012.

=== New York Jets ===
The New York Jets signed Hazelton to a reserve/future contract on January 23, 2013. He was waived on August 7, 2013 after suffering an undisclosed leg injury. Hazelton was placed on the team's injured reserve list on August 8, 2013.

=== Toronto Argonauts ===
Hazelton signed with the Toronto Argonauts of the Canadian Football League on Wednesday, March 18, 2015. In his first year in the CFL Hazelton played in 16 games for the Argos, and was suspended by the team for one game for accumulating too many objectionable conduct penalties. Hazelton contributed 70 pass receptions for 803 yards with 6 touchdowns in his rookie season. He was named the runner-up for the CFL Rookie of the Year award for 2015, being edged out by wide receiver Derel Walker.

Hazleton began the 2016 CFL season as one of the Argo's primary wide receivers, and was the first Argonaut to score a touchdown at their new home stadium BMO Field. Hazleton played in 8 of the Argos first 14 games, missing 6 due to injury. Following a Week 15 loss the Argos front office decided to release four of their wide receivers on the same day including Vidal Hazelton. Reports out of the locker room suggest the four wide receivers were not committed to the Argos and had been a source of division in the locker room for some time. In 8 games for the Argos Hazleton caught 27 passes for 361 yards with 3 touchdowns.

=== Edmonton Eskimos ===
Hazleton signed with the Edmonton Eskimos (CFL) on October 18, 2016. He did not make an appearance for the Eskimos during the 2016 season. On January 16, 2017, Hazleton was re-signed by the Eskimos. In his first full season in Edmonton Hazelton caught 55 passes for 709 yards with four touchdowns (he caught eight passes for 125 yards in the team's two playoff games). On February 5, 2018, Hazleton was re-signed by the Eskimos to a one-year deal, the same day the team released veteran receiver Adarius Bowman.
