= Vincenzo Fucheri =

Most Reverend Vincenzo Fucheri
- Bishop of Corneto e Montefiascone
- Church: Catholic Church
- Diocese: Diocese of Montefiascone
- In office: 1578–1580
- Predecessor: Francesco Guinigi
- Successor: Girolamo Bentivoglio

Personal details
- Died: 1580

Vincenzo Fucheri (fl. 1578 - died 1580) was a Roman Catholic prelate who served as Bishop of Corneto e Montefiascone (1578–1580).

== Biography ==
On 29 January 1578, Vincenzo Fucheri was appointed during the papacy of Pope Gregory XIII as Bishop of Corneto e Montefiascone. He served as Bishop of Corneto e Montefiascone until his death in 1580.

== External links and additional sources ==
- Cheney, David M. "Diocese of Montefiascone". Catholic-Hierarchy.org. (for Chronology of Bishops) ^{[self-published]}
- Chow, Gabriel. "Titular Episcopal See of Montefiascone (Italy)". GCatholic.org. (for Chronology of Bishops) ^{[self-published]}

Catholic Church titles
Preceded by Francesco Guinigi	Bishop of Corneto e Montefiascone; 1578–1580	Succeeded by Girolamo Bentivoglio
