= Francesco Guinigi =

Most Reverend Francesco Guinigi
- Bishop of Corneto e Montefiascone
- Church: Catholic Church
- Diocese: Diocese of Montefiascone
- In office: 1573–1578
- Predecessor: Ferdinando Farnese
- Successor: Vincenzo Fucheri

Personal details
- Died: January 1578

Francesco Guinigi (fl. 1573 - died January 1578) was a Roman Catholic prelate who served as Bishop of Corneto e Montefiascone (1573–1578).

== Biography ==
On 8 April 1573, Francesco Guinigi was appointed during the papacy of Pope Gregory XIII as Bishop of Corneto e Montefiascone. He served as Bishop of Corneto e Montefiascone until his death on January 1578.

== External links and additional sources ==
- Cheney, David M. "Diocese of Montefiascone". Catholic-Hierarchy.org. (for Chronology of Bishops) ^{[self-published]}
- Chow, Gabriel. "Titular Episcopal See of Montefiascone (Italy)". GCatholic.org. (for Chronology of Bishops) ^{[self-published]}

Catholic Church titles
Preceded by Ferdinando Farnese	Bishop of Corneto e Montefiascone; 1573–1578	Succeeded by Vincenzo Fucheri
