= Eusebio de Granito =

Most Reverend Eusebio de Granito
- Bishop of Capri
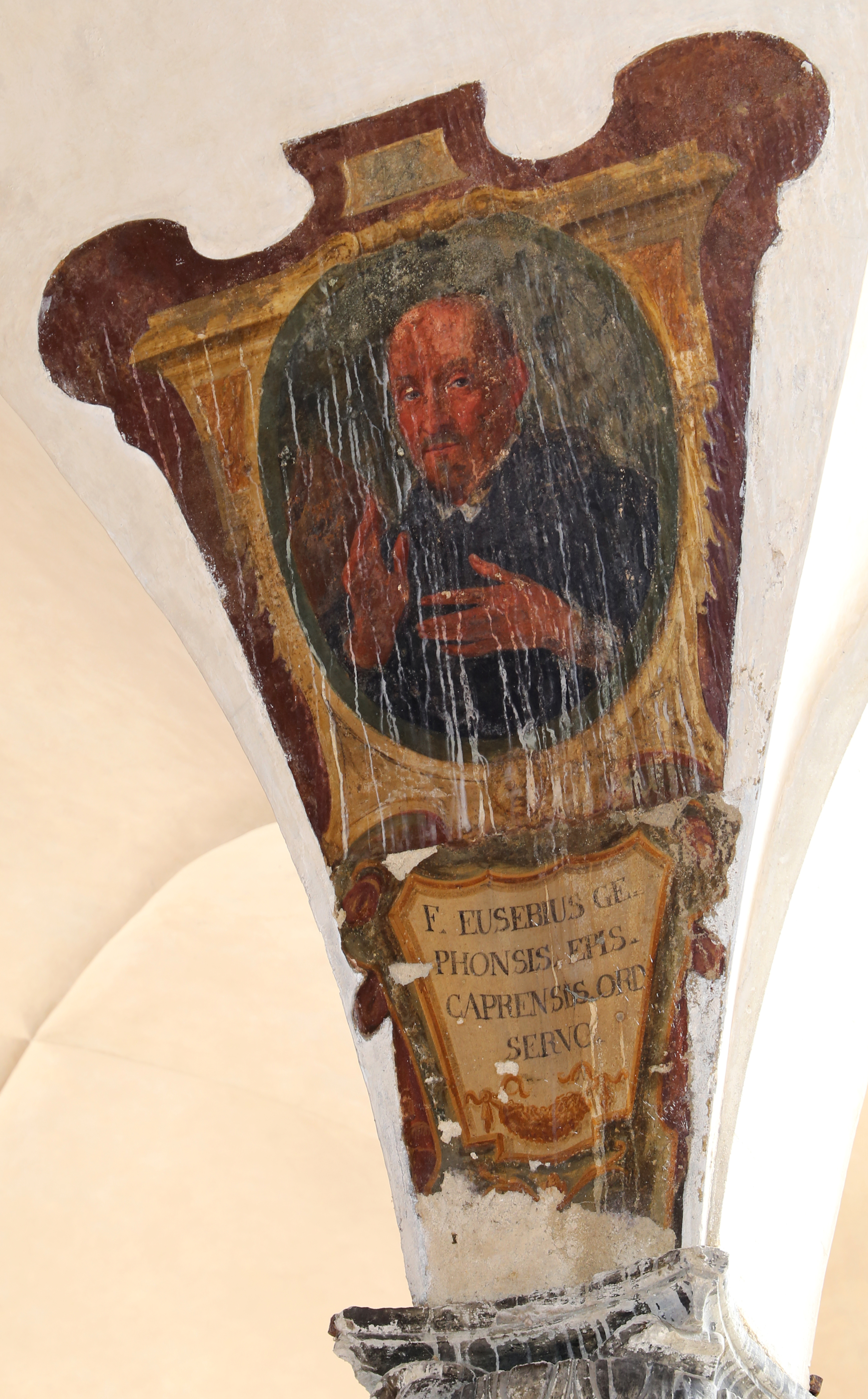
- Church: Catholic Church
- Diocese: Diocese of Capri
- In office: 1514–1528
- Predecessor: Raffaele Rocca
- Successor: Agostino Falivenia

Personal details
- Died: 1528 Capri, Italy

Eusebio de Granito (died 1528) was a Roman Catholic prelate who served as Bishop of Capri (1514–1528).

== Biography ==
On 18 August 1514, Eusebio de Granito was appointed during the papacy of Pope Leo X as Bishop of Capri. He served as Bishop of Capri until his death in 1528.

== External links and additional sources ==
- Cheney, David M. "Diocese of Capri". Catholic-Hierarchy.org. (for Chronology of Bishops) ^{[self-published]}
- Chow, Gabriel. "Titular Episcopal See of Capri (Italy)". GCatholic.org. (for Chronology of Bishops) ^{[self-published]}

Catholic Church titles
Preceded by Raffaele Rocca	Bishop of Capri; 1514–1528	Succeeded by Agostino Falivenia
