= Antonio Maria Gianelli =

Italian Roman Catholic bishop

Saint Antonio Maria Gianelli
- Bishop of Bobbio
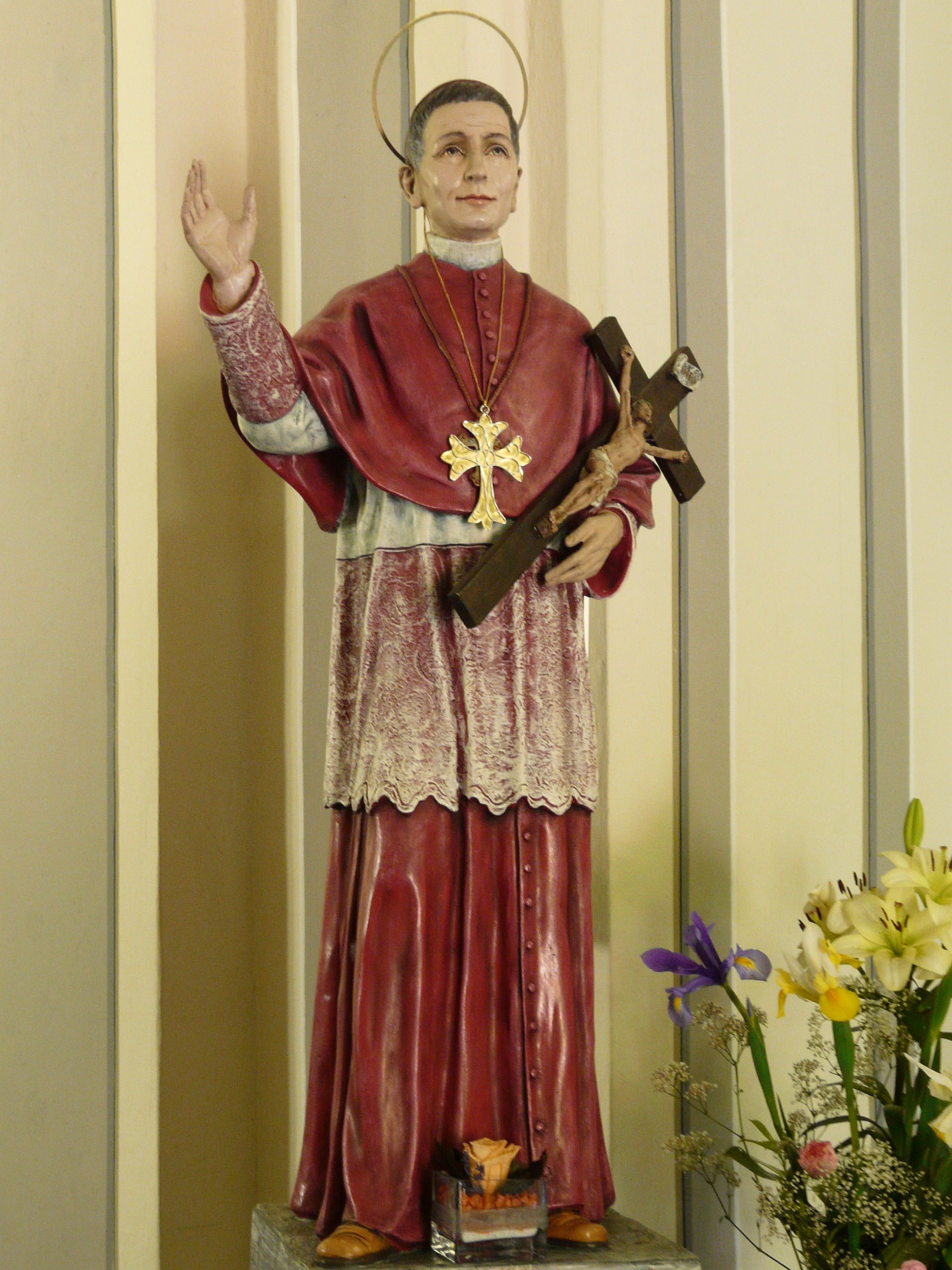
- Statue of Saint Antonio Maria Gianelli from the sanctuary of Cerreta, Carro, Liguria, Italy.
- Church: Roman Catholic Church
- Diocese: Bobbio
- See: Bobbio
- Appointed: 22 November 1837
- Term ended: 7 June 1846
- Predecessor: Giovanni Giuseppe Cavalleri
- Successor: Pier Giuseppe Vaggi

Orders
- Ordination: 28 May 1812
- Consecration: 6 May 1838 by Placido Maria Tadini
- Rank: Bishop

Personal details
- Born: Antonio Maria Gianelli; 12 April 1789 Cereta, Mantua, Duchy of Milan
- Died: 7 June 1846 (aged 57) Piacenza, Emilia-Romagna, Duchy of Parma

Sainthood
- Feast day: 7 June
- Venerated in: Roman Catholic Church; Apostolic Catholic Church
- Beatified: 19 April 1925; Saint Peter's Basilica, Kingdom of Italy by Pope Pius XI
- Canonized: 21 October 1951; Saint Peter's Basilica, Vatican City by Pope Pius XII
- Attributes: Episcopal attire; Crozier
- Patronage: Bobbio; Val di Vara; Figlie di Nostra Signora del Giardino

Antonio Maria Gianelli (12 April 1789 – 7 June 1846) was an Italian Roman Catholic prelate who served as the Bishop of Bobbio from 1837 until his death. He was also the founder of the Figlie di Nostra Signora del Giardino and the Missionaries of Saint Alphonsus. Gianelli was dedicated to the educational needs of his people and catered to their spiritual and material needs as well; he was on hand to aid the ill and the poor and made evangelization a focus to his episcopal mission. He likewise preached missions and became known for his charisma and his eloquence.

Gianelli's beatification was celebrated in 1925 and he was later canonized as a saint in late 1951. Since 4 June 2000 he has been the patron saint for both Bobbio and Val di Vara.

== Life ==
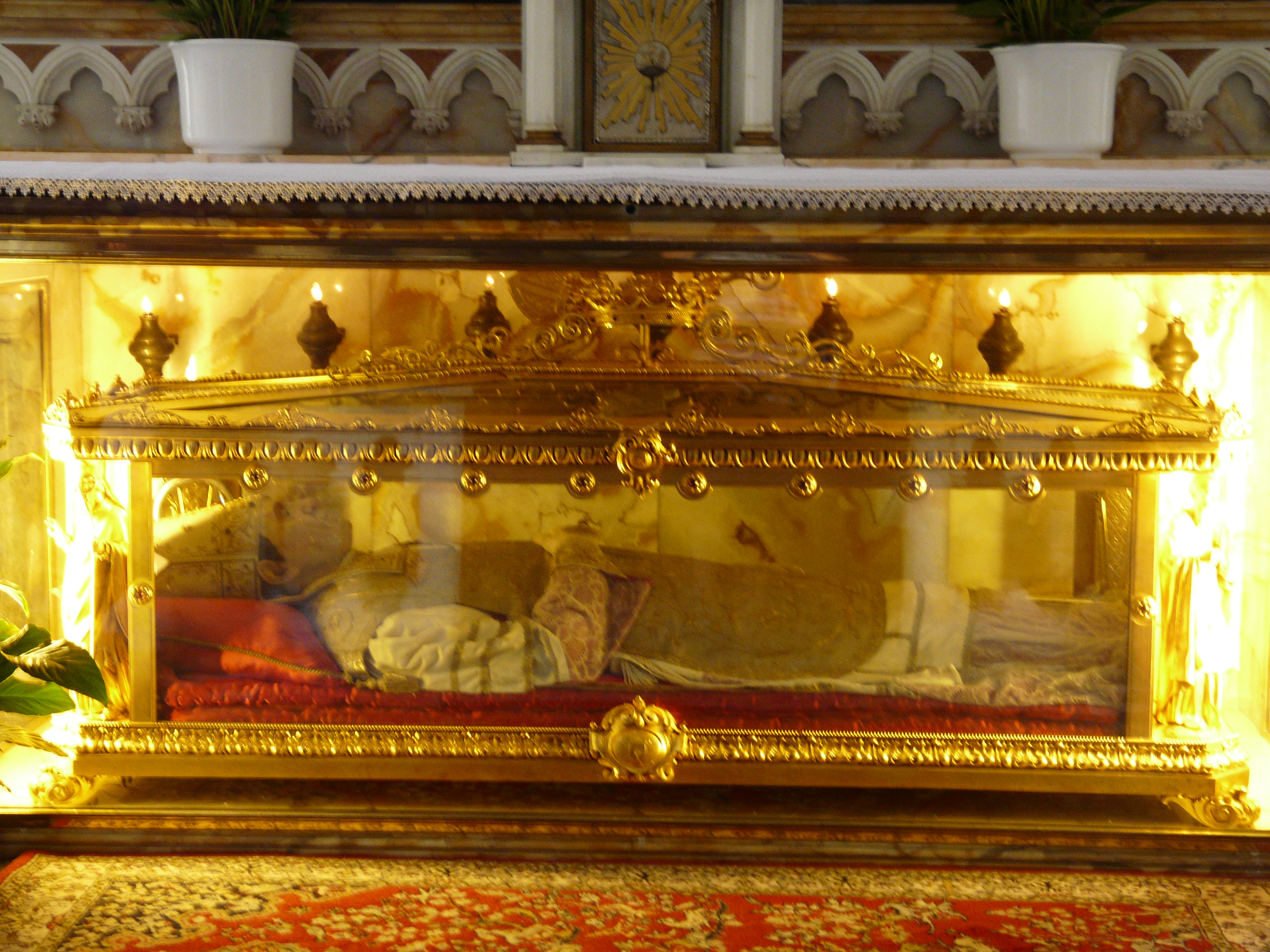
Tomb in the Bobbio duomo.

Antonio Maria Gianelli was born on 12 April 1789 - on Easter Sunday - to Giacomo and Maria Gianelli; he had five brothers. His mother often taught people catechism and his father was known for his efforts in peace-making in their town. He grew up in a small village of farmers and he was an exceptional student - so much so that the owner of the farm he lived on - Nicoletta Rebizzo - paid for his studies for the priesthood.

He commenced those studies in November 1807 in Genoa where he began his studies in dogmatics and liturgical practice and earned his doctorate. He had been made a subdeacon in September 1811 and was granted the rather unusual privilege of being allowed to preach while still a subdeacon due to his exceptional eloquence being a well-noted fact. The Cardinal Archbishop of Genoa Giuseppe Maria Spina ordained him to the diaconate in mid-1812. He was ordained to the priesthood in 1812 (in Genoa at the church of Nostra Signora del Carmine) and had to receive special dispensation since he was not at the canonical age required for ordination. Gianelli celebrated his first Mass in Cerreta. He served as a parish priest in Mantua after he was ordained. Spina sent Gianelli in 1812 to teach at Carcare in Savona. In February 1813 he was made the vice-parish priest of the San Matteo church in Genoa and on 23 May 1814 joined the Congregation of the Suburban Missionaries of Genoa. From September 1815 until 1817 he served as a professor at the college of the Padri Scolopi in Carcare before becoming a professor of rhetoric in November 1816 in Genoa. He remained there until 1822 when he was granted another position that he would hold for a decade. His future students included the future Archbishop of Genoa Salvatore Magnasco and Giuseppe Frassinetti.

Gianelli was made the archpriest of the church of Saint John the Baptist in Chiavari on 21 June 1826 after Luigi Lambruschini appointed him to that position; he held that position until 1837. From November 1826 he taught in Chiavari teaching his studies theological subjects as well as Latin and Greek. He was the founder of the Missionaries of Saint Alphonsus in 1827 for men and that order lasted from that point to 1856 while the Oblates of Saint Alphonsus lasted from its founding in 1828 until 1848 when it had to be dissolved. He also founded the Figlie di Nostra Signora del Giardino on 12 January 1829. It was a teaching order for females that worked with the sick. The order received formal papal approval from Pope Leo XIII on 7 June 1882 which came a few decades after Gianelli's death.

Pope Gregory XVI appointed him as the Bishop of Bobbio in 1837 and he received his episcopal consecration after his appointment. He had been preaching a mission in February 1838 when he learned that the appointment had been made. He restored devotion to Saint Columbanus in his diocese and conducted two diocesan synods. He visited each parish in his diocese on a regular basis. Gianelli spent long periods in the confessional in order to accommodate the endless stream of people seeking absolution.

In April 1845 he started to show signs of tuberculosis that had not been diagnosed from the onset; he spent the next month in recuperation where he seemed to regain his strength for a time. He seemed to recover during this period but his illness returned in the spring of 1846 and his condition started to deteriorate at a rapid pace. He died on 7 June 1846 due to a serious fever combined with the tuberculosis; he had been recuperating in Piacenza at the time. His order still continues its work in Europe and Asia and has also expanded to the United States of America. On 21 October 2001 a statue made out of white Carrara marble was dedicated to him.

== Sainthood ==
The cause for sainthood commenced under Pope Leo XIII on 2 June 1896 which gave him the title of Servant of God. Pope Benedict XV recognized his life of heroic virtue and declared him to be Venerable on 11 April 1920. Pope Pius XI beatified him on 19 April 1920 and Pope Pius XII canonized him in Saint Peter's Basilica on 21 October 1951.

Pope John Paul II - in an address to Gianelli's order on 17 February 2003 - recalled the saint for his "burning desire to belong to Christ" and hailed him for his dedication to evangelization and preaching.

=== Patronage ===
Since 4 June 2000 Bishop Antonio Maria Gianelli has been the patron saint for both Bobbio and Val di Vara.

== Bibliography ==
- Antonio Pellicani (1876). Compendio della vita di monsignor Antonio Gianelli, vescovo di Bobbio (in Italian). Parma: Tipografia Fiaccadori.
- Garofalo, Salvatore (2011). Un grande vescovo per una piccola diocesi. Sant'Antonio Maria Gianelli (in Italian). Cinisello Balsamo (Milano): San Paolo. ISBN 978-88-215-7064-3.
