= Shea Spitzbarth =

American baseball player (born 1994)

Free agent
- Pitcher
- Born: October 4, 1994 (age 31); Staten Island, New York, U.S.
- Bats: Right Throws: Right

MLB debut
- August 2, 2021, for the Pittsburgh Pirates

MLB statistics (through 2021 season)
- Win–loss record: 0–0
- Earned run average: 3.60
- Strikeouts: 1
- Stats at Baseball Reference

Teams
- Pittsburgh Pirates (2021)

Shea Spitzbarth (born October 4, 1994) is an American professional baseball pitcher who is a free agent. He has previously played in Major League Baseball (MLB) for the Pittsburgh Pirates.

== Amateur career ==
Spitzbarth was born and raised in Staten Island, New York. He played baseball at Moore Catholic High School, where he received All-City, All-Staten Island, and Advance All-Star honors. He would go on to pitch at Molloy College. After the completion of his junior season in 2015, he played collegiate summer baseball with the Wareham Gatemen of the Cape Cod Baseball League. He caught the eye of a Los Angeles Dodgers scout, was offered a contract, and signed.

== Professional career ==
=== Los Angeles Dodgers ===
Spitzbarth officially signed with the Los Angeles Dodgers on July 10, 2015, and began his professional career with the rookie–level Arizona League Dodgers and Ogden Raptors, posting a 2.75 ERA in 15 appearances. He split the 2016 season between Ogden and the Single–A Great Lakes Loons and Triple–A Oklahoma City Dodgers, accumulating a 2.72 ERA with 60 strikeouts in 24 games. In 2017, Spitzbarth played for the High–A Rancho Cucamonga Quakes and Double–A Tulsa Drillers, pitching to a 2.45 ERA with 77 strikeouts in 69 2/3 innings of work. The following season, Spitzbarth split time between Tulsa and Oklahoma City, registering a 4.32 ERA with 86 strikeouts in 66 2/3 innings pitched across 40 appearances. He returned to the two affiliates for the 2019 season, working to a 4.09 ERA with 89 strikeouts across 52 contests. Spitzbarth did not play in a game in 2020 due to the cancellation of the minor league season because of the COVID-19 pandemic.

=== Pittsburgh Pirates ===
On December 10, 2020, the Pittsburgh Pirates selected Spitzbarth in the minor league phase of the Rule 5 Draft. He was assigned to the Triple–A Indianapolis Indians to begin the season, where he pitched to a 2.12 ERA in 42 games. Spitzbarth was promoted to the major leagues for the first time on August 2, 2021. He made his Major League Baseball debut that day, pitching against the Milwaukee Brewers. Spitzbarth posted a 3.60 ERA with 1 strikeout in 5 innings of work across 5 appearances for Pittsburgh. On November 6, Spitzbarth was outrighted off of the 40-man roster and elected free agency the next day.

=== Detroit Tigers ===
On April 3, 2022, Spitzbarth signed a minor league contract with the Detroit Tigers organization. Spitzbarth made 44 combined appearances for the Double–A Erie SeaWolves and the Triple–A Toledo Mud Hens, logging a 6–0 record and 2.85 ERA with 46 strikeouts over 53 2/3 innings pitched. He elected free agency following the season on November 10.

=== Cincinnati Reds ===
On May 14, 2023, Spitzbarth signed with the Bravos de León of the Mexican League. However, prior to making an appearance for the team, on May 20, Spitzbarth signed a minor league contract with the Cincinnati Reds organization. In 12 games for the Triple–A Louisville Bats, he struggled to a 7.20 ERA with 10 strikeouts in 15 innings of work. On July 14, Spitzbarth was released by the Reds.

=== Rieleros de Aguascalientes ===
On March 7, 2024, Spitzbarth signed with the Rieleros de Aguascalientes of the Mexican League. In 30 appearances for Aguascalientes, Spitzbarth logged a 2.64 ERA with 27 strikeouts and 3 saves across 30 2/3 innings pitched.

=== Staten Island FerryHawks ===
On September 4, 2024, Spitzbarth signed with the Staten Island FerryHawks of the Atlantic League of Professional Baseball. In one start for the team, he threw 5 innings and gave up four hits and one earned run (1.80 ERA) with 6 strikeouts.

=== Diablos Rojos del México ===
On October 23, 2024, Spitzbarth was traded to the Leones de Yucatán in exchange for Sam Clay. He was released by Yucatán on January 30, 2025.

On February 15, 2025, Spitzbarth signed with the Diablos Rojos del México of the Mexican League. He was released prior to the start of the season.

== See also ==
- Rule 5 draft results
