= Loreto de Franchis =

Italian Catholic prelate (1578–1638)

Most Reverend Loreto de Franchis
- Bishop of Minori
- Church: Catholic Church
- Diocese: Diocese of Minori
- In office: 1636–1638
- Predecessor: Tommaso Brandolini
- Successor: Patrizio Donati
- Previous post: Bishop of Capri (1634–1636)

Orders
- Ordination: 1604
- Consecration: 26 March 1634 by Francesco Maria Brancaccio

Personal details
- Born: 1578 Castel di Sangro, Kingdom of Naples
- Died: 1638 (age 60) Minori, Kingdom of Naples

Loreto de Franchis or Loreto di Franco (1578–1638) was a Catholic prelate who served as Bishop of Minori (1636–1638) and Bishop of Capri (1634–1636).

== Biography ==
Loreto de Franchis was born in Castel di Sangro, Italy in 1578 and was ordained a priest in 1604. On 22 March 1634, he was appointed during the papacy of Pope Urban VIII as Bishop of Capri. On 26 March 1634, he was consecrated bishop by Francesco Maria Brancaccio, Bishop of Capaccio, Fausto Caffarelli, Archbishop of Santa Severina, with Giovanni Battista Altieri, Bishop Emeritus of Camerino, serving as co-consecrators. On 1 December 1636, he was appointed during the papacy of Pope Urban VIII as Bishop of Minori. He served as Bishop of Minori until his death in 1638.

== External links and additional sources ==
- Cheney, David M. "Diocese of Capri". Catholic-Hierarchy.org. (for Chronology of Bishops) ^{[self-published]}
- Chow, Gabriel. "Titular Episcopal See of Capri (Italy)". GCatholic.org. (for Chronology of Bishops) ^{[self-published]}
- Cheney, David M. "Diocese of Minori". Catholic-Hierarchy.org. (for Chronology of Bishops) ^{[self-published]}
- Chow, Gabriel. "Titular Episcopal See of Minori (Italy)". GCatholic.org. (for Chronology of Bishops) ^{[self-published]}

Catholic Church titles
Preceded by Raffaele Rastelli	Bishop of Capri; 1634–1636	Succeeded by Alessandro Sibilia
Preceded by Tommaso Brandolini	Bishop of Minori; 1636–1638	Succeeded by Patrizio Donati
