= Ubaldinus Bandinelli =

Roman Catholic prelate (died 1551)

Most Reverend Ubaldinus Bandinelli
- Bishop of Corneto e Montefiascone
- Church: Catholic Church
- Diocese: Diocese of Montefiascone
- In office: 1548–1551
- Predecessor: Guido Ascanio Sforza di Santa Fiora
- Successor: Achille Grassi

Personal details
- Died: March 1551

Ubaldinus Bandinelli (died 1551) was a Roman Catholic prelate who served as Bishop of Corneto e Montefiascone (1548–1551).

== Biography ==
On 4 June 1548, Ubaldinus Bandinelli was appointed during the papacy of Pope Paul III as Bishop of Corneto e Montefiascone. He served as Bishop of Corneto e Montefiascone until his death in March 1551.

== External links and additional sources ==
- Cheney, David M. "Diocese of Montefiascone". Catholic-Hierarchy.org. (for Chronology of Bishops) ^{[self-published]}
- Chow, Gabriel. "Titular Episcopal See of Montefiascone (Italy)". GCatholic.org. (for Chronology of Bishops) ^{[self-published]}

Catholic Church titles
Preceded by Guido Ascanio Sforza di Santa Fiora	Bishop of Corneto e Montefiascone; 1548–1551	Succeeded by Achille Grassi
