= Raffaele Rocca =

Roman Catholic bishop

Most Reverend Raffaele Rocca
- Church: Catholic Church
- Diocese: Diocese of Capri
- In office: 1499–1514
- Successor: Eusebio de Granito
- Previous post: Bishop of Lucera (1497–1499)

Orders
- Consecration: ŋ

Personal details
- Died: 1514 Capri, Italy

Raffaele Rocca (died 1514) was a Roman Catholic prelate who served as Bishop of Capri (1499–1514) and Bishop of Lucera (1497–1499).

== Biography ==
On 17 April 1497, Raffaele Rocca was appointed Bishop of Lucera by Pope Alexander VI. On 20 October 1499, he was transferred by Pope Alexander VI to the diocese of Capri.

He served as Bishop of Capri until his death in 1514.

== External links and additional sources ==
- Cheney, David M. "Diocese of Lucera-Troia". Catholic-Hierarchy.org. (for Chronology of Bishops) ^{[self-published]}
- Chow, Gabriel. "Diocese of Lucera-Troi (Italy)". GCatholic.org. (for Chronology of Bishops) ^{[self-published]}
- Cheney, David M. "Diocese of Capri". Catholic-Hierarchy.org. (for Chronology of Bishops) ^{[self-published]}
- Chow, Gabriel. "Titular Episcopal See of Capri (Italy)". GCatholic.org. (for Chronology of Bishops) ^{[self-published]}

Catholic Church titles
Preceded by Antonio Torres (bishop)	Bishop of Lucera; 1497–1499	Succeeded by Giovanni Di Luigi
Preceded by	Bishop of Capri; 1499–1514	Succeeded by Eusebio de Granito
