= Francesco Maria Abbiati =

Italian Roman Catholic prelate

Most Reverend Francesco Maria Abbiati
- Bishop of Bobbio
- Church: Catholic Church
- Diocese: Diocese of Bobbio
- In office: 1618–1650
- Predecessor: Marcantonio Bellini
- Successor: Alessandro Porro

Orders
- Consecration: 21 December 1618 by Giovanni Garzia Mellini

Personal details
- Died: 5 August 1650 Bobbio, Italy

Francesco Maria Abbiati, C.R.L. (died 5 August 1650) was a Roman Catholic prelate who served as Bishop of Bobbio (1618–1650).

== Biography ==
Francesco Maria Abbiati was ordained a priest in the Canons Regular of the Lateran. On 3 December 1618, he was appointed during the papacy of Pope Paul V as Bishop of Bobbio. On 21 December 1618, he was consecrated bishop by Giovanni Garzia Mellini, Cardinal-Priest of Santi Quattro Coronati. He served as Bishop of Bobbio until his death on 5 August 1650.

While bishop, he was the principal co-consecrator of Ippolito Campioni, Bishop of Chiusi (1638); and Francesco Antonio Biondo, Bishop of Capri (1638).

== External links and additional sources ==
- Cheney, David M. "Diocese of Bobbio (-Abbey of San Colombano)". Catholic-Hierarchy.org. (for Chronology of Bishops) ^{[self-published]}
- Chow, Gabriel. "Diocese of Bobbio–San Colombano (Italy)". GCatholic.org. (for Chronology of Bishops) ^{[self-published]}

Catholic Church titles
Preceded by Marcantonio Bellini	Bishop of Bobbio; 1618–1650	Succeeded by Alessandro Porro
