= Sam Clay =

American baseball player (born 1993)

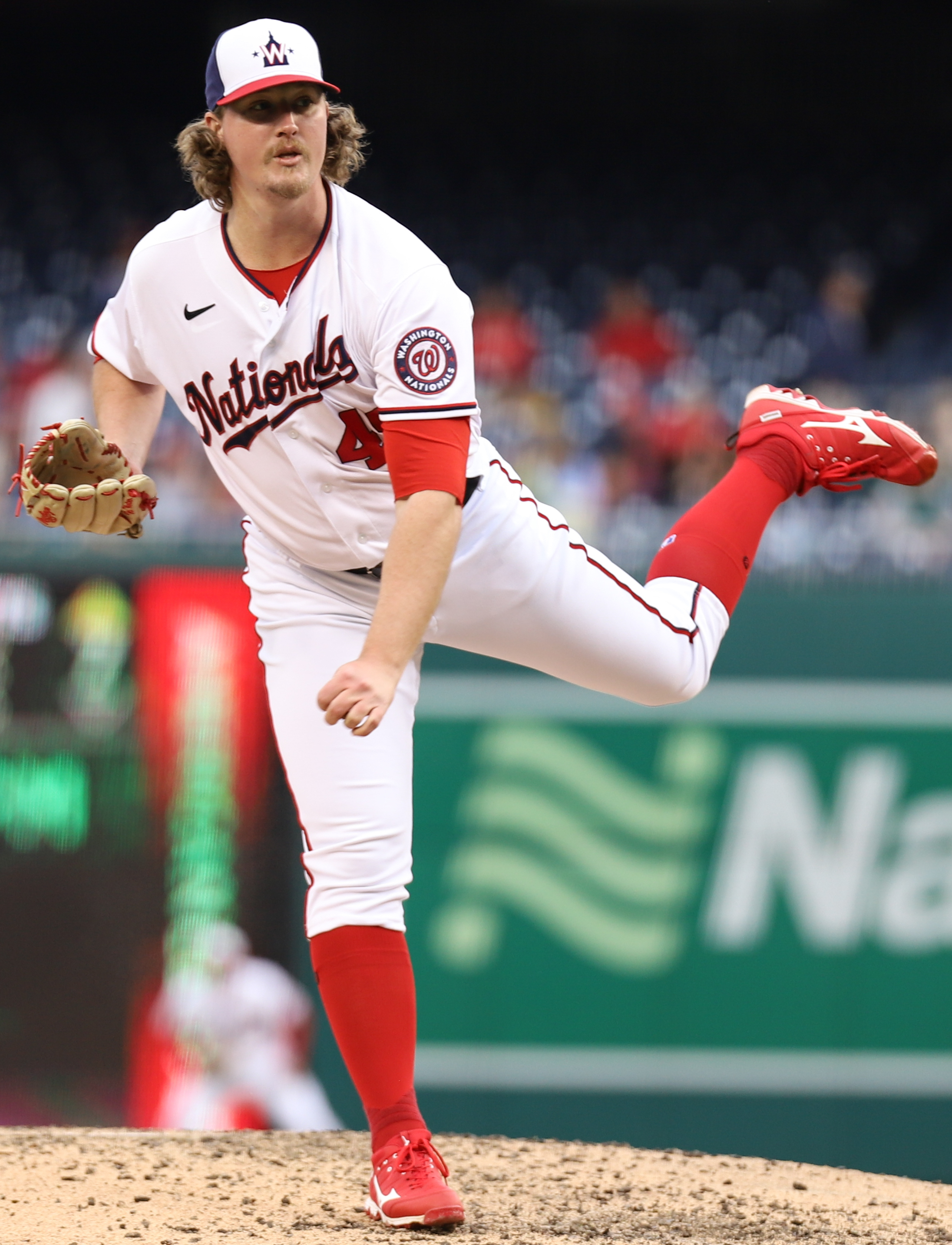
- Clay with the Washington Nationals in 2022

Free agent
- Pitcher
- Born: June 21, 1993 (age 32); Knoxville, Tennessee, U.S.
- Bats: Left Throws: Left

MLB debut
- April 7, 2021, for the Washington Nationals

MLB statistics (through 2022 season)
- Win–loss record: 0–5
- Earned run average: 5.90
- Strikeouts: 39
- Stats at Baseball Reference

Teams
- Washington Nationals (2021–2022); New York Mets (2022)

Samuel Thomas Hunter Clay (born June 21, 1993) is an American professional baseball pitcher who is a free agent. He has previously played in Major League Baseball (MLB) for the Washington Nationals and New York Mets. The Minnesota Twins selected Clay in the fourth round of the 2014 MLB draft. He made his MLB debut with the Nationals in 2021.

== Amateur career ==
Clay attended Buford High School in Buford, Georgia. He enrolled at the Georgia Institute of Technology, where he played college baseball for the Georgia Tech Yellow Jackets.

== Professional career ==
=== Minnesota Twins ===
As a draft-eligible sophomore, the Minnesota Twins selected Clay in the fourth round, with the 110th overall pick, of the 2014 Major League Baseball draft. He made his professional debut with the rookie-level Elizabethton Twins, recording a 5.59 ERA with 44 strikeouts across 19 games. Clay split the 2015 campaign between Elizabethton and the Single-A Cedar Rapids Kernels, accumulating a combined 1-6 record and 3.61 ERA with 73 strikeouts over 72 1/3 innings.

Clay split the 2016 season between Single-A Cedar Rapids and the High-A Fort Myers Miracle, accumulating a 6-7 record and 4.60 ERA with 115 strikeouts across 115 1/3 innings pitched. In 2017, he made 43 relief appearances for Fort Myers and the Double-A Chattanooga Lookouts, registering a cumulative 9-0 record and 1.87 ERA with 67 strikeouts and nine saves across 67 1/3 innings of work. Clay returned to Chattanooga in 2018, logging a 2-6 record and 5.88 ERA with 61 strikeouts in 52 innings pitched across 34 appearances.

In 2019, Clay played for the Double-A Pensacola Blue Wahoos and Triple-A Rochester Red Wings. In 45 appearances split between the two affiliates, he compiled a 4-4 record and 3.25 ERA with 72 strikeouts and 10 saves across 69 1/3 innings pitched. In 2020, he was a non-roster invitee to Minnesota's 60-man player pool, working out at the alternate training site at CHS Field in St. Paul. The season was subsequently cancelled as a result of the COVID-19 pandemic. The Twins never added Clay to their major league roster, and he became a minor league free agent after the 2020 season on November 2, 2020.

=== Washington Nationals ===
On November 18, 2020, the Washington Nationals announced they had signed Clay to a major league contract, adding him to a major league roster for the first time in his playing career. On April 6, 2021, Clay was promoted to the major leagues for the first time. He made his MLB debut the next day, throwing a shutout inning against the Atlanta Braves. Clay made 58 appearances for Washington during his rookie campaign, compiling an 0-5 record and 5.60 ERA with 34 strikeouts over 45 innings of work.

Clay made six appearances for the Nationals in 2022, struggling to a 10.38 ERA with three strikeouts in 4 1/3 innings pitched. He was designated for assignment by Washington on July 1, 2022.

On July 5, 2022, the Philadelphia Phillies claimed Clay off of waivers from the Nationals. He did not appear for the organization before was designated for assignment on July 8, following Kent Emanuel's activation from the injured list.

=== New York Mets ===
On July 10, 2022, Clay was claimed off waivers by the New York Mets. He tossed one scoreless inning of relief before he was designated for assignment on August 20. Clay cleared waivers and was sent outright to the Triple–A Syracuse Mets on August 23. In 19 games in Syracuse, Clay registered a 3.97 ERA with 25 strikeouts in 22 2/3 innings of work. He elected free agency following the season on November 10.

=== Detroit Tigers ===
On December 12, 2022, Clay signed a minor league contract with the Arizona Diamondbacks that included an invitation to spring training. Clay was released by the organization prior to the start of the season on March 24, 2023.

On April 30, 2023, Clay signed a minor league contract with the Detroit Tigers organization. In 42 games for the Triple–A Toledo Mud Hens, he logged a 6–3 record and 5.16 ERA with 53 strikeouts across 52 1/3 innings of work. Clay elected free agency following the season on November 6.

=== Olmecas de Tabasco ===
On May 26, 2024, Clay signed with the Olmecas de Tabasco of the Mexican League. In 16 games for Tabasco, he struggled to a 7.15 ERA with 11 strikeouts across 11 1/3 innings pitched. Clay was waived by the Olmecas on July 4.

=== Leones de Yucatán ===
On July 5, 2024, Clay was claimed off waivers by the Leones de Yucatán of the Mexican League. In 11 games for Yucatán, he logged a 1–1 record and 3.48 ERA with 13 strikeouts across 10 1/3 innings pitched.

=== Rieleros de Aguascalientes ===
On October 23, 2024, Clay was traded to the Rieleros de Aguascalientes in exchange for Shea Spitzbarth. In 21 appearances for Aguascalientes in 2025, he compiled a 1-0 record and 5.89 ERA with 18 strikeouts across 18 1/3 innings pitched. Clay was released by the Rieleros on June 5, 2025.

=== Pericos de Puebla ===
On June 11, 2025, Clay signed with the Pericos de Puebla of the Mexican League. In four appearances for Puebla, he struggled to a 10.80 ERA with no strikeouts and one saves across 1 2/3 innings pitched. Clay was released by the Pericos on June 20.

=== High Point Rockers ===
On July 24, 2025, Clay signed with the High Point Rockers of the Atlantic League of Professional Baseball. In three appearances for High Point, he struggled to a 16.88 ERA with three strikeouts across 2 2/3 innings pitched. Clay was released by the Rockers on September 2.

== Pitching style ==
Clay is noted as an extreme groundball pitcher who rarely allows home runs. His pitching arsenal includes a sinking fastball and an above-average curveball.
