= Daughters of Our Lady of the Garden =

The Daughters of Our Lady of the Garden (Italian: Figlie di Maria Santissima dell'Orto; Latin: Congregatio Filiarum Mariae Sanctissimae ab Horto; abbreviation: F.M.H.) is a Catholic religious institute of pontifical right whose members profess public vows of chastity, poverty, and obedience and follow the evangelical way of life in common.

Their mission includes pastoral ministry, education of youth, care of the sick, and the elderly.

This religious institute was founded in Chiavari, near Genoa, Italyl, in 1829, by Antonio Maria Gianelli, later bishop of Bobbio, and his collaborator, Caterina Podestà; in 1868, Pope Pius IX granted Pontifical approval to the Institute.

The sisters have houses in Argentina, Bolivia, Brazil, Chile, Congo, India, Italy, Jordan, Palestine, Paraguay, Spain, United States, Uruguay, DR Congo and Papua New Guinea. The Generalate of the Congregation can be found in Rome, Italy.

On 2015 there were approximately 700 sisters around the world.
