= Diocese of Montefiascone =

Former Latin Catholic diocese in Italy

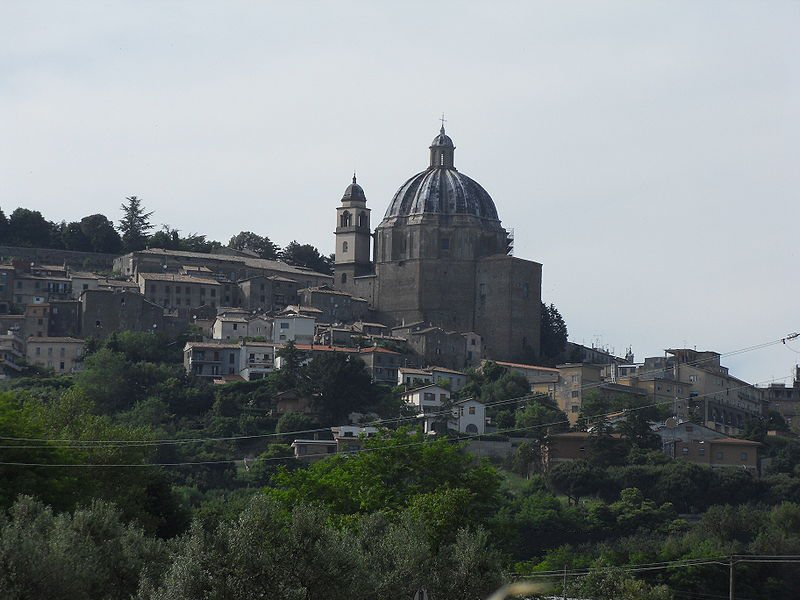
Montefiascone Cathedral

The Diocese of Montefiascone (Latin Name: Faliscodunensis o Montis Falisci) was a Latin Church diocese of the Catholic Church in Italy. It was created from the diocese of Bagnorea in 1369. In 1986 was incorporated into the diocese of Viterbo, Acquapendente, Bagnoregio, Montefiascone, Tuscania e San Martino al Monte Cimino. The diocese was immediately subject to the Holy See.

== History ==
The town of Montefiascone, or, more specifically, the Rocca di Montefiascone, had long been the official residence of the Rector of the Patrimony of Saint Peter, and, whenever a pope visited, of the pope as well.

Pope Urban V had stayed at Montefiascone during his journey from Avignon to Rome, and was greatly impressed by the loyalty and affection of the inhabitants toward himself and his predecessors. The Pope held a consistory for the creation of new cardinals at Montefiascone on 22 September 1368. He named six Frenchmen, a Roman, and an Englishman (Simon Langham).

The diocese of Montefiascone was erected by Pope Urban V by the papal bull, Cum Illius of 31 August 1369. He appointed the church of S. Margarita to serve as its cathedral, and he installed in it a Chapter composed of two dignities (the Dean and the Sacristan) and eight Canons with prebends. The Dean was to be elected by the Chapter and installed by the bishop, but the other offices were to be filled by appointment by the bishop. The territory for the diocese was taken from the diocese of Bagnoregio, and any properties or rights within that territory which belonged to the bishops of Bagnoregio, Castro, Orvieto, Viterbo or Tuscano were assigned to the bishop of Montefiascone.

Pope Urban held another consistory for the creation of new cardinals at Montefiascone on 7 June 1370. Two cardinals were named, one a Florentine and the other from Rodez in France. He departed from Montefiascone for Avignon on 26 August 1370, where he died on 19 December 1370.

=== New diocese ===
Its first bishop was the French Augustinian Pierre d'Anguiscen, appointed in 1376. In 1378, when the Western Schism began, Bishop Pierre became a partisan of Clement VII (Avignon Obedience), and he was therefore deposed by Urban VI (Roman Obedience).

On 5 December 1435, the diocese of Montefiascone was united with the diocese of Corneto in the person of the bishop; that is the bishop of Montefiascone was also at the same time the bishop of Corneto, with each diocese retaining its own institutional integrity. The union continued until, in 1854, Corneto became a part of the diocese of Civitavecchia.

In 1483, Bishop Domenico della Rovere laid the cornerstone for the new cathedral of S. Margarita in Montefiascone, and in his Last Will and Testament in 1501 he left money to continue the work, which had barely reached the level of the main floor of the church at the time of his death.

==== Synods ====
Cardinal Marcantonio Barbarigo (1687–1706) held a diocesan synod in the cathedral of Montefiascone on 1–3 June 1692. Bishop Lodivio Zacchia held a diocesan synod in 1622. Cardinal Jean-Siffrein Maury (1794–1816) held a diocesan synod. Bishop Sebastiano Pompilio Bonaventura (1706–1734) presided over a diocesan synod on 16–18 June 1710.

The erection of the diocesan seminary for Corneto and Montefiascone was the work of Cardinal Marcantonio Barbarigo.

=== End of the diocese ===
By the middle of 1986, papal policy in the selection of bishops had concentrated in the person of Bishop Luigi Boccadoro: the Diocese of Viterbo e Tuscania, the diocese of Acquapendente (since 1951), the diocese of Montefiascone (since 1951), and the Administratorship of the diocese of Bagnoregio (since 1971); he was also the Abbot Commendatory of Monte Cimino. On 30 September 1986 Pope John Paul II moved to consolidate these several small dioceses by suppressing them and uniting their territories into the diocese of Viterbo e Tuscania, whose name was changed to the Diocese of Viterbo. The diocese of Montefiascone ceased to exist as a territorial circumscription.

== Bishops ==
=== Diocese of Montefiascone ===
- Pierre d'Anguiscen (1369–1378)
- Nicola Scarinci (1379–1398)
- Antonius (Porziani) (1398–1404)
- Andreas de Galeatiis (1404–c.1410?)
- Antonius de Anagnia (c.1410–1429)
- Dominicus, O.P. (1429–1432)
- Petrus Antonius (1432–1435)

=== Diocese of Corneto (Tarquinia) e Montefiascone ===
5 December 1435: one bishop was the head of two dioceses at the same time
Latin Name: Cornetanus Tarquiniensis et Montisflasconsis

- Pietro Dell'Orto (1435–1439)

[Valentinus]

- Bartholomaeus Vitelleschi (1438–1442)
- Francesco Materio (1442–1449)
- Bartholomaeus Vitelleschi (1449–1463)
- Angelo Vitelleschi (1464–1467)
- Gisberto Tolomei (1467 – 1478 Died)
- Domenico della Rovere (24 Aug 1478 – 22 Apr 1501 Died)
- Alessandro Farnese (1499 –1509)
- Lorenzo Pucci (23 Mar 1519 – 13 Apr 1519 Resigned)
- Guido Ascanio Sforza (12 Nov 1528 – 4 Jun 1548 Resigned)
- Ubaldinus Bandinelli (4 Jun 1548 – Mar 1551 Died)
- Achille Grassi (21 Aug 1551 – 1555 Died)
- Carlo Grassi (20 Dec 1555 – 25 Mar 1571 Died)
- Ferdinando Farnese (27 Aug 1572 – 30 Mar 1573 Appointed, Bishop of Parma)
- Francesco Guinigi (8 Apr 1573 – Jan 1578 Died)
- Vincenzo Fucheri (29 Jan 1578 – 1580 Died)
- Girolamo Bentivoglio (7 Oct 1580 – 12 Apr 1601 Died)
- Paolo Emilio Zacchia (14 May 1601 – 31 May 1605 Died)
- Laudivio Zacchia (1605 – 13 May 1630 Resigned)
- Gasparo Cecchinelli (13 May 1630 – 1666 Died)
- Paluzzo Paluzzi Altieri Degli Albertoni (29 Mar 1666 –1670)
- Domenico Massimo (1671–1685)

Sede vacante (1685–1687)

- Cardinal Marcantonio Barbarigo (1687–1706)
- Sebastiano Pompilio Bonaventura (1706–1734)
- Pompeio Aldrovandi (9 Jul 1734 – 6 Jan 1752 Died)

Sede vacante (6 January 1752–14 January 1754)

- Saverio Giustiniani (1754–1771)
- Francesco Maria Banditi, C.R. (30 Mar 1772–1775 Resigned)
- Cardinal Giuseppe Garampi (1776–1792)
- Cardinal Jean-Siffrein Maury (1794–1816 Resigned)

Sede vacante (1817–1820)

- Bonaventura (Domenico Giuseppe) Gazzola, O.F.M. Ref. (21 Feb 1820 – 29 Jan 1832 Died)
- Giuseppe Maria Velzi, O.P. (2 Jul 1832 – 23 Nov 1836 Died)
- Gabriele Ferretti (1837)
- Filippo de Angelis (15 Feb 1838 Succeeded –1842)
- Nicola Mattei Baldini (27 Jan 1842 – 23 Oct 1843 Died)
- Niccola Paracciani Clarelli (22 Jan 1844 – Jun 1854 Resigned)

=== Diocese of Montefiascone ===
14 June 1854: United with the Diocese of Civitavecchia and then split into the Diocese of Montefiascone and the Diocese of Tarquinia e Civitavecchia
Immediately Subject to the Holy See

- Luigi Jona (1854–1863)
- Giuseppe Maria Bovieri (22 Feb 1867 – 22 Apr 1873 Died)
- Concetto Focaccetti (25 Jul 1873 – 15 Jul 1878 Appointed, Bishop of Acquapendente)
- Luigi Rotelli (15 Jul 1878 – 22 Dec 1882 Resigned)
- Luciano Gentilucci (15 Mar 1883 – 29 Nov 1895 Appointed, Bishop of Fabriano e Matelica)
- Domenico Rinaldi (29 Nov 1895 – 21 Apr 1907 Died)
- Domenico Mannaioli (16 Aug 1907 – 6 Aug 1910 Resigned)
- Giovanni Rosi (19 Dec 1910 – 5 Apr 1951 Died)
- Luigi Boccadoro (14 Jun 1951 – 1986)

30 September 1986: suppression of the diocese of Montefiascone.

=== Titular Diocese of Mons Faliscus (Montefiascone) ===
With the appointment of Bishop Gerald Richard Barnes on 28 Jan 1992 as an auxiliary bishop of the San Bernardino, the title of Titular Bishop of Mons Faliscus (Montefiascone) was assigned to him and subsequently to other bishops over time:

- Gerald Richard Barnes (28 Jan 1992 - 28 Dec 1995
- Jozef Zlatňanský (11 Jun 1997 - 11 Feb 2017 Died)
- Fabio Fabene (28 Feb 2017 - )

== Bibliography ==
=== Reference works ===
- Gams, Pius Bonifatius (1873). Series episcoporum Ecclesiae catholicae: quotquot innotuerunt a beato Petro apostolo. Ratisbon: Typis et Sumptibus Georgii Josephi Manz. p. 706. (Use with caution; obsolete)
- Eubel, Conradus, ed. (1913). Hierarchia catholica. Vol. Tomus 1 (second ed.). Münster: Libreria Regensbergiana. p. . (in Latin)
- Eubel, Conradus, ed. (1914). Hierarchia catholica. Vol. Tomus 2 (second ed.). Münster: Libreria Regensbergiana. p. 152.
- Eubel, Conradus; Gulik, Guilelmus (1923). Hierarchia catholica, Tomus 3 (second ed.). Münster: Libreria Regensbergiana. pp. .
- Gauchat, Patritius (Patrice) (1935). Hierarchia catholica. Vol. IV (1592-1667). Münster: Libraria Regensbergiana. p. .
- Ritzler, Remigius; Sefrin, Pirminus (1952). Hierarchia catholica medii et recentis aevi. Vol. V (1667-1730). Patavii: Messagero di S. Antonio. p. .
- Ritzler, Remigius; Sefrin, Pirminus (1958). Hierarchia catholica medii et recentis aevi. Vol. VI (1730-1799). Patavii: Messagero di S. Antonio. p. .
- Ritzler, Remigius; Sefrin, Pirminus (1968). Hierarchia Catholica medii et recentioris aevi (in Latin). Vol. VII (1800–1846). Monasterii: Libreria Regensburgiana.
- Remigius Ritzler; Pirminus Sefrin (1978). Hierarchia catholica Medii et recentioris aevi (in Latin). Vol. VIII (1846–1903). Il Messaggero di S. Antonio.
- Pięta, Zenon (2002). Hierarchia catholica medii et recentioris aevi (in Latin). Vol. IX (1903–1922). Padua: Messagero di San Antonio. ISBN 978-88-250-1000-8.

=== Studies ===
- Benigni, Umberto. "Diocese of Montefiascone." The Catholic Encyclopedia. Vol. 10. New York: Robert Appleton Company, 1911. Retrieved: 26 November 2022. [obsolete, unbalanced]
- Buti, Luigi Pieri (1870). Storia di Montefiascone (in Italian). Montefiascone: Argentini.
- Cappelletti, Giuseppe (1846). Le chiese d'Italia: dalla loro origine sino ai nostri giorni (in Italian). Vol. quinto (5). Venice: G. Antonelli. pp. 627–686.
- De Angelis, Girolamo (1841). Commentario storico-critico su l'origine e le vicende della citta e chiesa...di Montefiascone (in Italian). Montefiascone: Typ. del Seminario.
- Ughelli, Ferdinando; Coleti, Nicolò (1717). Italia sacra: sive De episcopis Italiae et insularum adjacentium (in Latin). Vol. Tomus primus. Venice: apud Sebastianum Coleti. pp. 975–990.
