= Roman Catholic Diocese of Ortona a Mare e Campli =

The Roman Catholic Diocese of Ortona a Mare e Campli (Latin: Dioecesis Ortonensis et Camplensis) was a Roman Catholic diocese in Italy, located in the city of Ortona, in the Province of Chieti in the Italian region of Abruzzo. In 1834, it was united with the Archdiocese of Lanciano to form the Archdiocese of Lanciano (e Ortona).

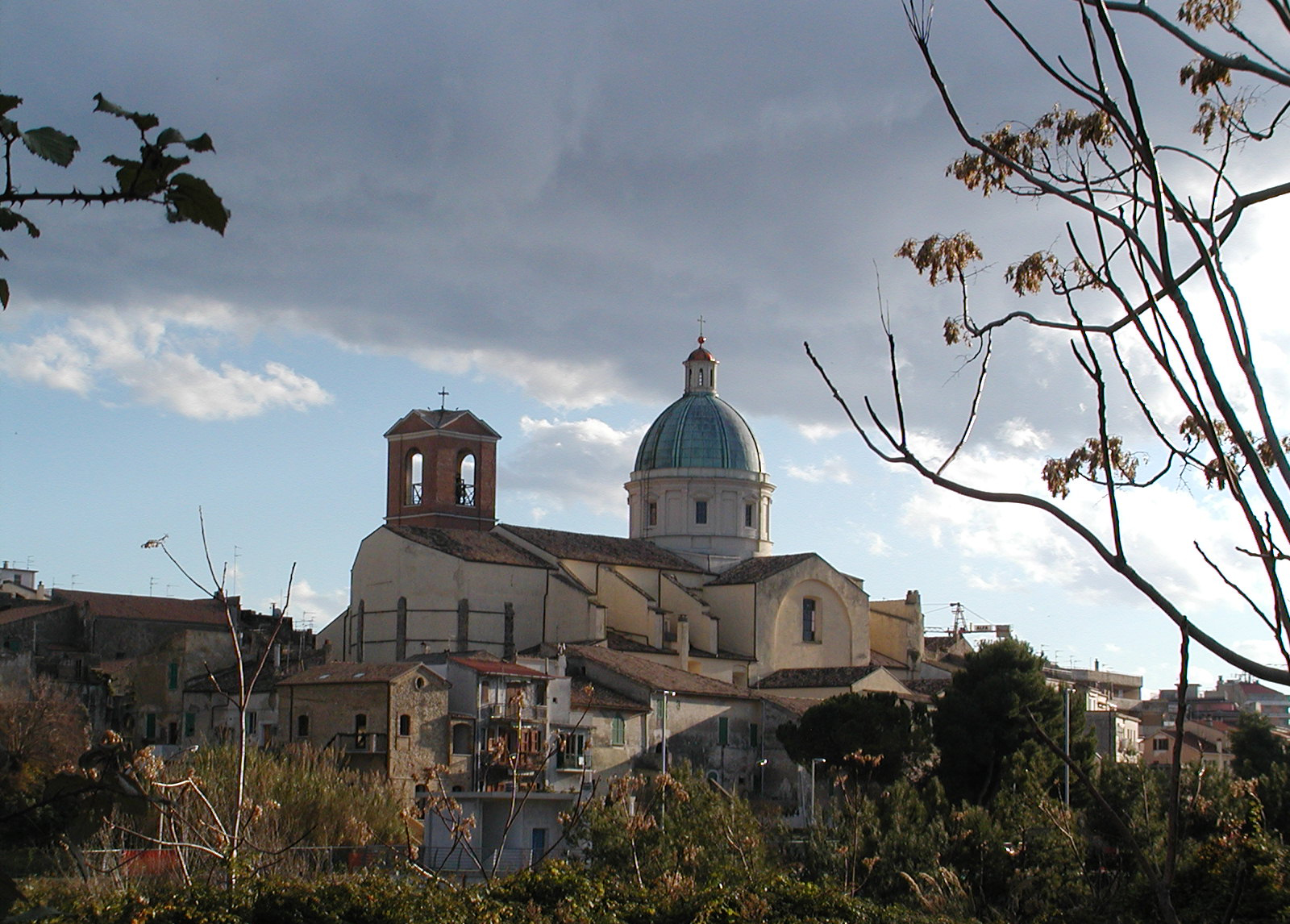
Cathedral of S. Thomas, Ortona

== History ==
The diocese of Ortona was in existence by the last quarter of the 6th century, as letters of Pope Gregory I concerning the bishops of Ortona indicate. Bishop Blandus was being held in detention in Ravenna by the Exarch Romanus, and the pope wanted the exarch either to bring him up before a synod if he had committed some crime, or else allow him to return to his Church.

Pope Paschal II issued a bull, "Ex Praedecessoris", on 18 July 1115, to the people of the parrochia of Chieti and the county of Chieti, announcing the confirmation of various grants to the Church of Chieti by Count Robert Loratello and his brother Tasso; the bull mentions in passing an exchange of property between Bishop Rainulfus of Chieti and Abbot Ugo of S. Giovanni de Ardano, which included Mucela, which is near Ortona. On 28 September 1173, Pope Alexander III issued the bull "In Eminenti" in favor of Bishop Andrea of Chieti, in which he delimited the territory and confirmed the rights and property of the diocese of Chieti. This was a repetition of bulls issued by Pope Nicholas II, Pope Paschal II, and Pope Eugenius III. The bull specifically mentions as belonging to Chieti: "in Ortona ecclesia Sanctae Mariae et Sancti Georgii cum earum pertinentiis, monasterium S. Mariae in Basilica."

In the great earthquake of 5 December 1456, many houses and other buildings were destroyed in Ortona, with a loss of life of 433 persons.

Pope Clement VII raised the diocese of Chieti to the rank of archdiocese by the bull "Super Universas", on 1 June 1526. He assigned the new metropolitan the suffragan dioceses of Lanciano, Penne, and Adria. No mention is made of Ortona, which was not yet a diocese.

On 1 August 1566, Ortona became another victim of the marauding fleet of 105 Turkish galleys led by Piali Pasha, which had already attacked and ravaged Francavilla and the Adriatic coastal towns belonging to Chieti. Houses were ransacked and put to the torch, and the tomb of S. Thomas was broken into in search of gold and silver. The inhabitants, who had seen the approach of the Saracens, were able to save their lives by flight.

=== Restoration of diocese of Ortona ===
On 20 October 1570, Pope Pius V established (or restored) the diocese of Ortona, and made it a suffragan diocese of Chieti.

On 15 May 1604, in the bull "Pro excellenti", Pope Clement VIII established the diocese of Campli, and assigned the bishop of Ortona to be its bishop well. The territory for the new diocese was taken from the northeastern part of the diocese of Teramo and from the diocese of Montalto. In creating the diocese, the pope admitted that the funds available were insufficient to provide for a diocesan establishment at Campli.

A concordat between the Papacy and the Kingdom of the Two Sicilies was signed on 16 February 1818, and ratified by Pope Pius VII on 25 February 1818. King Ferdinand issued the concordat as a law on 21 March 1818. The right of the king to nominate the candidate for a vacant bishopric was recognized, as in the Concordat of 1741, subject to papal confirmation (preconisation). On 27 June 1818, Pius VII issued the bull De Ulteriore, in which the diocese of Ortona was suppressed, and its ecclesiastical territory was assigned to the archdiocese of Lanciano. When, in 1818, Ortona was joined to Lanciano, the territory of the diocese of Campli, which had been annexed to Ortona, was assigned to the diocese of Teramo.

On 17 June 1834, Pope Gregory XVI issued the bull Ecclesiarum omnium, in which the arrangement made by Pope Pius VII 1818 was reversed. The diocese of Ortona was restored, and the cathedral which had been reduced to the status of a collegiate church was restored to cathedral status. It's college of clerics again became the canons of the cathedral of Ortona. The finances of the old diocese of Ortona, which had been incorporated into those of the diocese of Lanciano, were again separated. The one exception to the return to the status quo ante was the seminary. It was deemed more efficient for both dioceses to use the seminary of Lanciano on equal terms. The archbishop of Lanciano became the "Perpetual Administrator of the Church of Ortona."

== Bishops ==
=== Diocese of Ortona ===
Established: c. 580
Latin Name: Ortonensis

- Blandus (attested 591–594)
- Calumniosus (attested 599)
- Victor (attested 649)

Suppressed: incorporated in the Diocese of Chieti

Restored: 1570
Metropolitan: Archdiocese of Chieti

- Giovanni Domenico Rebiba (8 Nov 1570 – 11 Dec 1595 Appointed, Bishop of Catania)
- Alessandro Boccabarile (15 Jan 1596 – 31 Oct 1623 Died)

=== Diocese of Ortona a Mare e Campli ===
Name Changed: 12 May 1600
Latin Name: Ortonensis et Camplensis

- Antimo degli Atti (1 Jul 1624 – 1 Oct 1640 Died)
- Francesco Antonio Biondo, O.F.M. Conv. (3 Dec 1640 – 21 Dec 1643 Died)
- Alessandro Crescenzi), C.R.S. (13 Jun 1644 – 1652)
- Carlo Bonafaccia (3 Feb 1653 – 1675)
- Giovanni Vespoli-Casanatte, C.R. (27 May 1675 – 13 Aug 1716 Died)
- Giuseppe Falconio (20 Dec 1717 – 16 Mar 1730 Died)
- Giovanni Romano (11 Sep 1730 – 1735)
- Marc'Antonio Amalfitani (26 Sep 1735 – 11 Nov 1765 Died)
- Domenico de Dominicis (27 Jan 1766 – 8 Mar 1791 Died)
- Antonio Cresi (26 Mar 1792 – 22 Sep 1804 Died)

19 February 1834: United with the Archdiocese of Lanciano to form the Archdiocese of Lanciano (e Ortona).

== See also ==
- Roman Catholic Archdiocese of Lanciano-Ortona
- Catholic Church in Italy

== Books ==
=== Reference works ===
- Gams, Pius Bonifatius (1873). Series episcoporum Ecclesiae catholicae (in Latin). Ratisbon: Typis et Sumptibus Georgii Josephi Manz. p. 910.
- Eubel, Conradus; Gulik, Guilelmus (1923). Hierarchia catholica (in Latin). Vol. III (second ed.). Münster: Libreria Regensbergiana.
- Gauchat, Patritius (Patrice) (1935). Hierarchia catholica (in Latin). Vol. IV (1592-1667). Münster: Libraria Regensbergiana.
- Ritzler, Remigius; Sefrin, Pirminus (1952). Hierarchia catholica medii et recentis aevi (in Latin). Vol. V (1667-1730). Patavii: Messagero di S. Antonio.
- Ritzler, Remigius; Sefrin, Pirminus (1958). Hierarchia catholica medii et recentis aevi (in Latin). Vol. VI (1730-1799). Patavii: Messagero di S. Antonio.
- Ritzler, Remigius; Sefrin, Pirminus (1968). Hierarchia Catholica medii et recentioris aevi... (in Latin). Vol. VII (1800–1846). Monasterii: Libr. Regensburgiana.
- Remigius Ritzler; Pirminus Sefrin (1978). Hierarchia catholica Medii et recentioris aevi (in Latin). Vol. VIII (1846–1903). Il Messaggero di S. Antonio.
- Pięta, Zenon (2002). Hierarchia catholica medii et recentioris aevi... (in Latin). Vol. IX (1903-1922). Padua: Messagero di San Antonio. ISBN 978-88-250-1000-8.

=== Studies ===
- Cappelletti, Giuseppe (1870). Le chiese d'Italia dalla loro origine sino ai nostri giorni (in Italian). Vol. vigesimoprimo (21). Venezia: Antonelli. pp. 91–94.
- D'Avino, Vincenzo (1848). Cenni storici sulle chiese arcivescovili, vescovili, e prelatizie (nulluis) del Regno delle Due Sicilie (in Italian). Napoli: Ranucci. pp. 206–207.
- Kehr, Paul Fridolin (1908). Italia pontificia. vol. IV. Berlin 1909. pp. 276-277. (in Latin)
- Ughelli, Ferdinando; Coleti, Niccolo (1720). Italia Sacra Sive De Episcopis Italiae (in Latin). Vol. Tomus sextus (6). Venezia: Coleti. pp. 772–785.; Tomus decimus, p. 811.

==== External links ====
- Cheney, David M. "Diocese of Ortona a Mare e Campli" Catholic-Hierarchy.org. Retrieved January 30, 2016.
- Chow, Gabriel. "Diocese of Ortona" GCatholic.org. Retrieved February 14, 2016.
