= Roman Catholic Diocese of Capri =

Roman Catholic diocese in Capri, Campania, Italy

The Roman Catholic Diocese of Capri (Latin: Dioecesis Capriensis seu Capritana) was a Roman Catholic diocese located in the city of Capri on the island of Capri, in the Tyrrhenian Sea off the Sorrentine Peninsula, on the south side of the Gulf of Naples in the Campania region of Italy. On 27 June 1818, it was suppressed to the Archdiocese of Sorrento.

== History ==
• 987: Established as Diocese of Capri from Diocese of Amalfi
• 1818.06.27: Suppressed by amalgamation with the Archdiocese of Sorrento
• 1968: Restored as Titular Episcopal See of Capri

== Ordinaries ==
=== Diocese of Capri ===
Erected: 987

...

- Benedetto de Pradosso (10 Dec 1398 – 16 Feb 1418 Appointed, Bishop of Ravello)

...

- Giovanni Di Luigi (1490–1500) Appointed, Bishop of Lucera
- Raffaele Rocca (20 Oct 1499 – 1514 Resigned)
- Eusebio de Granito (18 Aug 1514 – 1528 Died)
- Agostino Falivenia (Pastineus), O.S.M. (25 Sep 1528 – 24 Apr 1534 Appointed, Bishop of Ischia)
- Angelo Baretta (24 Apr 1534 – 1539 Died)
- Leonardo de Magistris (13 Feb 1540 – 21 Aug 1551 Appointed, Bishop of Alessano)
- Alfonso de Valdecabras (21 Aug 1551 – 1555 Resigned)
- Alfonso de Sásamo, O.S.B. (16 Dec 1555 – 1564 Resigned)
- Filippo Mazzola (bishop) (6 Sep 1564 – 1584 Died)
- Francesco Liparuli (Liparolo) (28 Nov 1584 – 1608 Died)
- Troiano Bozzuto, C.O. (17 Mar 1608 – 21 Nov 1625 Died)
- Raffaele Rastelli, C.R. (16 Mar 1626 – 11 Sep 1633 Died)
- Loreto Di Franco (De Franchis) (22 Mar 1634 – 1 Dec 1636 Appointed, Bishop of Minori)
- Alessandro Sibilia (20 Apr 1637 – Jun 1637 Died)
- Francesco Antonio Biondo, O.F.M. Conv. (14 Dec 1637 – 3 Dec 1640 Appointed, Bishop of Ortona a Mare e Campli)
- Paolo Pellegrini (18 Mar 1641 – Apr 1683 Died)
- Dionisio Petra, O.S.B. (12 Jul 1683 – Jun 1698 Died)
- Michele Gallo Vandeinde (15 Sep 1698 – 18 Dec 1727 Resigned)
- Giovanni Maria de Laurentiis, O. Carm. (22 Dec 1727 – 20 Mar 1751 Died)
- Francesco Antonio Rocco (17 May 1751 – 1776 Died)
- Nicolò Saverio Gamboni (16 Dec 1776 – 24 Aug 1807 Confirmed, Patriarch of Venice)

== See also ==
- Catholic Church in Italy
