= Giuseppe Abbiati =

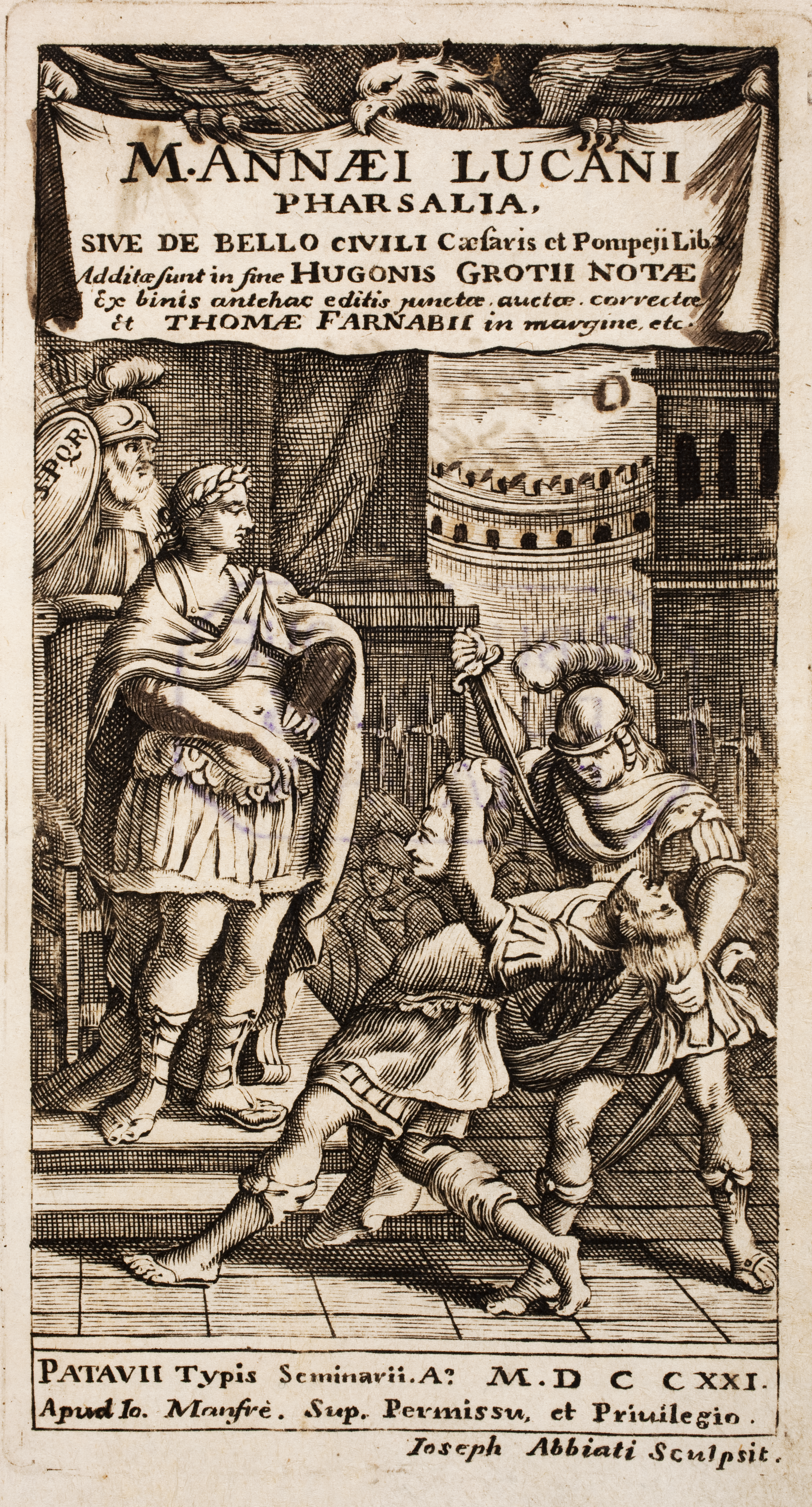
M. Annæi Lucani Pharsalia, sive De bello civili Cæsaris et Pompeji, title page by Giuseppe Abbiati, 1721

Giuseppe Abbiati was an Italian engraver, active during the beginning of the 18th century in Milan. He etched some small prints of battles, and allegorical subjects of his own design.
