= Giovanni Domenico Rebiba =

The Most Reverend Giovanni Domenico Rebiba
- Bishop of Catania
- Church: Catholic Church
- Diocese: Diocese of Catania
- In office: 1595–1604
- Predecessor: Juan Corrionero
- Successor: Juan Ruiz Villoslada
- Previous post: Bishop of Ortona (1570-1595)

Orders
- Consecration: 19 November 1570 by Scipione Rebiba

Personal details
- Died: 6 February 1604 Catania, Italy

Giovanni Domenico Rebiba (died 6 February 1604) was a Catholic prelate who served as Bishop of Catania (1595–1604) and Bishop of Ortona (1570–1595).

On 8 November 1570, Giovanni Domenico Rebiba was appointed during the papacy of Pope Pius V as Bishop of Ortona. On 19 November 1570, he was consecrated bishop by Scipione Rebiba, Cardinal-Priest of Santa Maria in Trastevere, with Nicola Perusco, Bishop of Civita Castellana e Orte, and Francesco Rusticucci, Bishop of Fano, serving as co-consecrators. On 11 December 1595, he was appointed during the papacy of Pope Clement VIII as Bishop of Catania. He served as Bishop of Catania until his death on 6 February 1604.

== External links and additional sources ==
- Cheney, David M. "Archdiocese of Catania". Catholic-Hierarchy.org. (for Chronology of Bishops) ^{[self-published]}
- Chow, Gabriel. "Metropolitan Archdiocese of Catania". GCatholic.org. (for Chronology of Bishops) ^{[self-published]}

Catholic Church titles
Preceded by None	Bishop of Ortona; 1570–1595	Succeeded by Alessandro Boccabarile
Preceded by Juan Corrionero	Bishop of Catania; 1595–1604	Succeeded by Juan Ruiz Villoslada
