= Paolo Maria Abbiati =

Italian engraver

Paolo Maria Abbiati was an Italian engraver whose name occurs on a portrait of Girolamo Cornaro, procurator of St. Mark's in Venice. He was active towards the close of the 17th century, and born in Milan.
