= Diocese of Bobbio =

Italian bishopric

Diocese of Bobbio Dioecesis Bobiensis
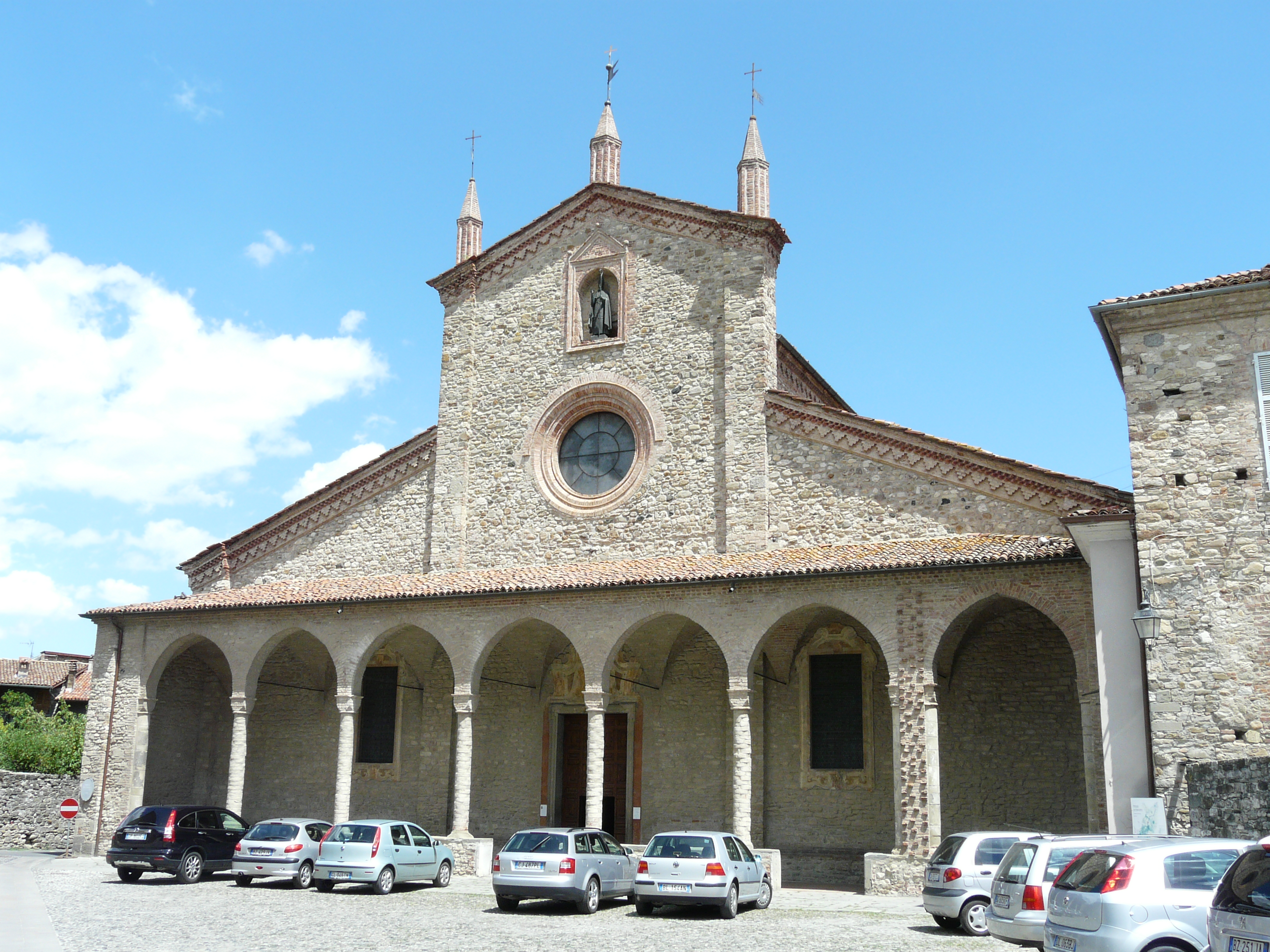

Location
- Country: Italy
- Metropolitan: Genoa

Information
- Denomination: Catholic Church
- Rite: Roman Rite
- Established: 1014 - 1986 (suppressed)
- Cathedral: Cattedrale della Beata Vergina Maria e San Pietro

Current leadership
- Pope: Leo XIV

The Roman Catholic diocese of Bobbio was an Italian bishopric which existed from 1014 until 1986. The diocese was formed from the territory of the Abbey of Bobbio.

== History ==
In the year 1014, the Emperor Henry II, on the occasion of his own coronation in Rome, obtained from Pope Benedict VIII the erection of the Abbey of Bobbio, which was celebrating its 500th anniversary, as an episcopal see. The date of 25 February 1014 is sometimes given for the erection of the diocese, but that is the date of the coronation of the Emperor Henry in Rome. Neither the Emperor's charter nor the Pope's bull, however, survives. The diocese was made a suffragan of the metropolitan of Milan.

The abbot of Bobbio had long been a Count of the Holy Roman Empire in the territory of the Abbey, and he owed feudal dues, including soldiers, when called upon. The abbots continued to hold the title and rank even after the erection of the diocese of Bobbio. In the bishopric of Bishop Luizo, the fourth bishop (c. 1050), the bishop of Bobbio was granted the title of Count for the city of Bobbio.

Pietroaldo, its first bishop, had been Abbot of Bobbio since 999; in contemporary documents he is referred to as abbas et episcopus monasterio sancti Colombani sito Bobio. His episcopal successors for a long time lived in the abbey, where several of them had been monks. The monastery, however, claimed to be directly subject to the Holy See, not to a local bishop, even the Bishop of Bobbio, which produced nearly two centuries of friction and litigation between the Abbey and the Bishop of Bobbio. In 1144 Pope Lucius II granted the monks the right of electing their own abbot. Pope Eugenius III (1145–1153) ruled that the confirmation and blessing of a new abbot, the consecration of altars and churches, and the appointment of monks and clergy, were the right of the bishop of Bobbio and his successors; the decision was confirmed by Pope Lucius III (1181–1185) when further litigation took place. On 28 August 1339, Bishop Calvus de Calvis made a formal visitation to the monastery of S. Colombano, and received the oath of fidelity and obedience from the abbot; he also issued a decree for the reformation of the monastery.

According to Ferdinando Ughelli and others, the diocese Bobbio was made a suffragan see of the Metropolitan Archdiocese of Genoa by Pope Innocent II on 19 March 1133 in the Bull Iustus Dominus. Fedele Savio finds this subordination mentioned for the first time in a Bull of Pope Alexander III, dated 19 April 1161, but in his discussion he remarks that Genoa was only given four suffragans: Mariana, Nebbio and Accia on the island of Corsica, and Brugnato on the mainland. The papal Bull of Innocent II, in fact, names five suffragans, the four just named and a fifth on the mainland, Vobzensem, which is in fact not the name of an actual diocese, but a scribal corruption of Bobiensem, as Ughelli and every other scholar have recognized. The papal Bull of Alexander III, Superna et ineffabilis, addressed to Archbishop Syrus of Genoa, paraphrases the bull of Innocent II, including the phrase in which Bobbio is made a suffragan of Genoa. On 11 May 1219, Bishop Uberto Rocca received Statutes of the Archdiocese of Genoa for promulgation in his diocese.

In 1199 alarming reports reached the ears of Pope Innocent III about the corrupt state of discipline in the monastery of S. Colombano, "that there was hardly a trace of religious feeling in either the abbot or the monks." He issued a mandate to Bishop Oberto of Bobbio on 1 December 1199 to use the power of supervision which had been granted him by the Holy See to visit the monastery, and then send a representative to Rome to report on his findings, so that the Pope could take further measures; he was given until the fourth Sunday in Lent in 1200 to make his report. In the meantime the Pope had entrusted the duty of correcting the monastery to two abbots from Pavia. The abbots were ordered by the Pope to consult with Bishop Oberto.

In 1447 the number of monks remaining in the monastery of S. Colombano di Bobbio had grown so small that Bishop Marciano Baccarini (1447–1463) was compelled to bring Benedictines from the Congregation of S. Justina di Parma to Bobbio to ensure the continuation of the foundation. He also constructed the episcopal palace.

During the occupation of Italy by the armies of the French Republic and then the First Empire, the diocese of Bobbio was suppressed, and its territory reassigned to the diocese of Casale-Monferrato. After the restoration of the Kingdom of Sardinia (Duchy of Savoy), the diocese was restored to its former borders in 1817.

In 1923 it was united with the Territorial Abbey of San Colombano, at Bobbio, from which it originated, with the combined official name diocese of Bobbio-San Colombano. As reorganised in 1986, the territory of the former diocese of Bobbio became part of the Metropolitan Archdiocese of Genova-Bobbio.

In a subsequent change, Bobbio Abbey's 'united title' was transferred, in 1989, to the Metropolitan Diocese of Piacenza-Bobbio, and the territory of the former diocese of Bobbio became part of the diocese of Piacenza.

The Cathedral has a Chapter, composed of two dignities (the Provost and the Archpriest) and ten Canons.

== Bishops ==
=== Diocese of Bobbio ===
==== to 1400 ====
- Pietro Aldo (1014–1017)
- Atto (1017–1027)
- Sigefred (attested 1027)
- Luizo (attested 1046, 1048)
- Opizo (Opizzone) (1059– c.1068)
- Guarnerio (c. 1068– ? )
- Ugo (c. 1085– c. 1098)
- Alberto (1098– c. 1118)
- Oddo (Oddone) (attested 1118)
- [Palemone ( ? – 1125?)]
- Simone Malvicino (c. 1125–1148)
- Oberto Malvicino (1148–1152)
- Oglerio Malvicino (c. 1153–c. 1176)
- Gandolfo (1178–1184)
- Albert (1184–1185)
- Otto (1185–1203)
- Uberto Rocca (1203–1233)
- Albertus (Ubertus) de Andito (1233–1251??)
- Johannes Gobbo (1274–1293)
- Pietro de Bubiano, O.P. (attested 1296 – after 1318)
- Giordano de Monte Cucco (1326 ? – after 20 February 1337)
- Calvus de Calvis (c. 1339 – c. 1360)
- Robertus de Lanfranchis, O.E.S.A. (1362–1395)
- Ubertus de Torano (1396–1404)

==== from 1400 to 1700 ====
- Alessio di Siregno, O.F.M. (1405–1409)
- Lanzarotus de Fontana (1409–1419)
- Daniele Pagani (1419–1447)
- Marciano Baccarini (1447–1458?)

Sede vacante

- [Antonius Bernuttius (1463)]
- Stefano Ghillini, O.P. (1465–1472)
- Giovanni de Mondani (1472–1482)
- Lucchino Trotti (1482–1494)
- Bernardino Ilcino, O.S.A. (1495–1500)
- Giovanni Battista Bagaroto (1500–1519)
- Cardinal Agostino Trivulzio (1522–1524 Resigned) (Administrator)
- Ambrogio Trivulzio (1524–1546)
- Borso Merli (1546–1560 Resigned)
- Sebastiano Donati (1560–1561)
- Francesco Abbondio Castiglioni (1562–1568)
- Eugenio Camuzzi (1568–1602)
- Camillo Aulario (1602–1607)
- Marco Antonio Bellini (1607–1618)
- Francesco Maria Abbiati, C.R.L. (1618–1650)
- Alessandro Porro, C.R. (1650–1660)
- Bartolomeo Capra (1661–1693)
- Carlo Giuseppe Morozzo, O.Cist. (1693–1698)

==== from 1700 to 1927 ====
- Ambrogio Croce, O.S.B. (1698–1713)
- Carlo Francesco Gallarini (1714–1716)
- Idelfonso Manara, B. (1716–1726)
- Carlo Cornaccioli, O. Carm. (1726–1737)
- Giuseppe Luigi de Andujar, O.P. (1737–1743)
- Bernardino Campi (1743–1746)
- Gaspare Lancellotti-Birago (1746–1765)
- Ludovico Terin Bonesio, O.F.M. Cap. (1766–1780)
- Carlo Nicola Maria Fabi Borsella, O.E.S.A. (1781–1803)

Diocese suppressed (1803–1817)

- Isaia Volpi, O.F.M. Cap. (1818–1830)
- Giovanni Giuseppe Antonio Cavalleri, O.F.M. Cap. (1832–1836)
- Antonio Maria Gianelli (1838–1846)
- Pier Giuseppe Vaggi, O.F.M. Cap. (1849-1869)
- Enrico Gajo, O.F.M. Cap. (1872–1880)
- Giovanni Battista Porrati (1880–1902)
- Pasquale Morganti, O.Ss.C.A. (1902–1904 Appointed, Archbishop of Ravenna)
- Carlo Castelli, Obl.S.C. (1904–1906 Appointed, Archbishop of Fermo)
- Luigi Maria Marelli (1907–1915 Appointed, Bishop of Bergamo)
- Pietro Calchi Novati (1914–1927 Appointed, Bishop of Lodi)

=== Diocese of Bobbio (-Abbey of San Colombano) ===
United: 4 August 1923 with the Territorial Abbey of San Colombano
Metropolitan: Archdiocese of Genoa

- Matteo Pellegrino (1928–1936 Died)
- Bernardo Bertoglio (1937–1953 Died)
- Pietro Zuccarino (1953–1973 Died)

== Bibliography ==
=== Reference works ===
- Gams, Pius Bonifatius (1873). Series episcoporum Ecclesiae catholicae: quotquot innotuerunt a beato Petro apostolo. Ratisbon: Typis et Sumptibus Georgii Josephi Manz. pp. 813–814. (in Latin)
- Eubel, Conradus, ed. (1913). Hierarchia catholica. Vol. Tomus 1 (second ed.). Münster: Libreria Regensbergiana. (in Latin)
- Eubel, Conradus, ed. (1914). Hierarchia catholica. Vol. Tomus 2 (second ed.). Münster: Libreria Regensbergiana. (in Latin)
- Gulik, Guilelmus (1923). Eubel, Conradus (ed.). Hierarchia catholica. Vol. Tomus 3 (second ed.). Münster: Libreria Regensbergiana. (in Latin)
- Gauchat, Patritius (Patrice) (1935). Hierarchia catholica. Vol. Tomus IV (1592-1667). Münster: Libraria Regensbergiana. (in Latin)
- Ritzler, Remigius; Sefrin, Pirminus (1952). Hierarchia catholica medii et recentis aevi V (1667-1730). Patavii: Messagero di S. Antonio.
- Ritzler, Remigius; Sefrin, Pirminus (1958). Hierarchia catholica medii et recentis aevi. Vol. Tomus VI (1730-1799). Patavii: Messagero di S. Antonio. (in Latin)
- Ritzler, Remigius; Sefrin, Pirminus (1968). Hierarchia Catholica medii et recentioris aevi sive summorum pontificum, S. R. E. cardinalium, ecclesiarum antistitum series... A pontificatu Pii PP. VII (1800) usque ad pontificatum Gregorii PP. XVI (1846) (in Latin). Vol. VII. Monasterii: Libr. Regensburgiana.
- Remigius Ritzler; Pirminus Sefrin (1978). Hierarchia catholica Medii et recentioris aevi... A Pontificatu PII PP. IX (1846) usque ad Pontificatum Leonis PP. XIII (1903) (in Latin). Vol. VIII. Il Messaggero di S. Antonio.
- Pięta, Zenon (2002). Hierarchia catholica medii et recentioris aevi... A pontificatu Pii PP. X (1903) usque ad pontificatum Benedictii PP. XV (1922) (in Latin). Vol. IX. Padua: Messagero di San Antonio. ISBN 978-88-250-1000-8.

=== Studies ===
- Bertacchi, Daniele (1859). Monografia di Bobbio, ovvero cenni storici statistici, topografici ed economici (in Italian). Pinerolo: G. Chiantore. pp. 46–47, 60–63, 237–247.
- Bonnard, F. (1937). Bobbio, in: Dictionnaire d'histoire et de géographie ecclésiastiques, Vol. IX (Paris: Letouzey, 1937), pp. 275–284. (in Italian) [list of bishops at pp. 283–284]
- Cipolla, Carlo (ed.). Codice diplomatico del monastero di S. Colombano di Bobbio Volume I (Roma: Tipografia del Senato 1918). Volume II. Volume III.
- Destefanis, Eleonora; Guglielmotti, Paola (2015). La diocesi di Bobbio. Formazione e sviluppi di un'istituzione millenaria (in Italian). Firenze University Press. ISBN 978-88-6655-855-2.
- Kehr, Paul Fridolin (1914). Italia pontificia : sive, Repertorium privilegiorum et litterarum a romanis pontificibus ante annum 1598 Italiae ecclesiis, monasteriis, civitatibus singulisque personis concessorum. Vol. VI. pars ii. Berolini: Weidmann. pp. 242–255.
- Piazza, A. (1997). Monastero e vescovado di Bobbio (dalla fine del X agli inizi del XIII secolo) Spoleto (PG) 1997. (in Italian)
- Polonio, Valeria (2015). "«Bobiensis Ecclesia»: un vescovado peculiare tra XI e XII secolo." in: Destefanis and Guglielmotti, La diocesi di Bobbio, pp. 179–224. (in Italian)
- Savio, Fedele (1898). Gli antichi vescovi d'Italia dalle origini al 1300 descritti per regioni: Il Piemonte (in Italian). Torino: Fratelli Bocca. pp. 158–174.
- Schwartz, Gerhard (1907). Die Besetzung der Bistümer Reichsitaliens unter den sächsischen und salischen Kaisern: mit den Listen der Bischöfe, 951-1122. Leipzig: B.G. Teubner. (in German)
- Ughelli, Ferdinando; Coleti, Niccolo (1719). Italia sacra, sive de episcopis Italiae et insularum adjacentium (in Latin). Vol. Tomus quartus (4) (2nd ed.). Venice: Apud Sebastianum Coleti. pp. 925–979.
