= Cardinal of Urbino =

Cardinal of Urbino may refer to:

- Giovanni Battista Mellini (1405–1478), bishop of Urbino, 1468–78, cardinal 1476–78
- Gabriele de' Gabrielli (1445–1511), bishop of Urbino, 1504–11, cardinal 1505-11
