= Lazarus Racanelli =

Italian Roman Catholic prelate (died 1484)

Most Reverend Lazarus Racanelli
- Bishop of Urbino
- Church: Catholic Church
- Diocese: Diocese of Urbino
- In office: 1478–1484
- Predecessor: Giovanni Battista Mellini
- Successor: Filippo Contorni

Personal details
- Died: 1484

Lazarus Racanelli, O.P. (died 1484) was a Roman Catholic prelate who served as Bishop of Urbino (1478–1484).

== Biography ==
Lazarus Racanelli was ordained a priest in the Order of Preachers. On 14 Aug 1478, he was appointed during the papacy of Pope Sixtus IV as Bishop of Urbino. He served as Bishop of Urbino until his death in 1484.

== External links and additional sources ==
- Cheney, David M. "Archdiocese of Urbino-Urbania-Sant'Angelo in Vado". Catholic-Hierarchy.org. (for Chronology of Bishops) ^{[self-published]}
- Chow, Gabriel. "Archdiocese of Urbino-Urbania-Sant'Angelo in Vado (Italy)". GCatholic.org. (for Chronology of Bishops) ^{[self-published]}

Catholic Church titles
| Preceded by Giovanni Battista Mellini | Bishop of Urbino; 1478–1484 | Succeeded by Filippo Contorni |
