= Mellini Chapel =

Chapel in the church of Santa Maria del Popolo, Rome

Mellini Chapel Cappella Mellini
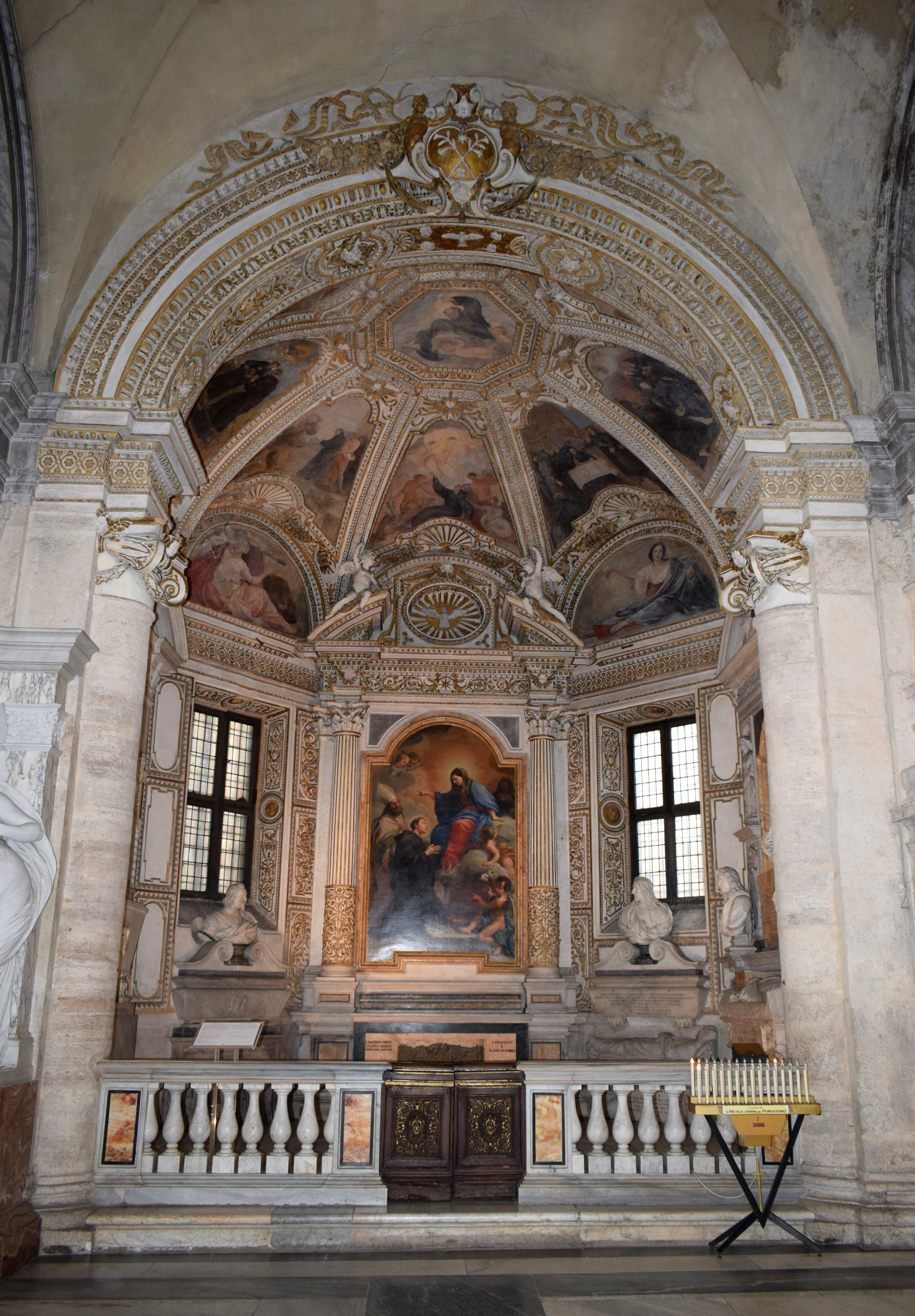

Religion
- Status: funerary chapel

Location
- Location: Basilica of Santa Maria del Popolo, Rome
- Interactive map of Mellini Chapel; Cappella Mellini
- Coordinates: 41.911389°N 12.476389°E

Architecture
- Type: hexagonal chapel
- Style: Baroque
- Founder: Pietro Mellini, Giovanni Garzia Mellini
- Completed: 1628

The Mellini or Saint Nicholas of Tolentino Chapel (Italian: Cappella Mellini, Cappella di San Niccolò da Tolentino) is the third chapel on the left-hand side of the nave in the Church of Santa Maria del Popolo in Rome. The chapel contains several funeral monuments of the members of the Mellini family among them the works of Alessandro Algardi and Pierre-Étienne Monnot.

== History ==
The first patron of the chapel was a celebrated jurist, Pietro Mellini who belonged to a noble and ancient Roman family. The chapel, which was dedicated to Saint Nicholas of Tolentino, is one of the original 15th-century hexagonal side chapels of the basilica. It has been the funeral place of the Mellini family for centuries. Originally it had two monumental Renaissance tombs facing each other, made for Cardinal Giovanni Battista Mellini and his brother, Pietro around 1478-83. A similar arrangement is still visible in other side chapels of the basilica.

The appearance of the chapel was fundamentally changed when it was rebuilt by Cardinal Giovanni Garzia Mellini in the 1620s in Baroque style. The whole interior was covered with white and gold stuccos, and the vault was decorated with frescos depicting scenes from the life of Saint Nicholas of Tolentino by a Florentine artist, Giovanni da San Giovanni who was paid 130 scudi "as the rest and final installment of payment for the several works done" on 27 October 1627. The main altar was consecrated in 1628. The previous Renaissance tombs were dismantled to make way for the monumental Baroque sepulchres of Cardinal Giovanni Garzia Mellini in the 1630s and Cardinal Savio Mellini in the 1690s.

In the middle of the 18th century the chapel was restored again and the main altarpiece was replaced by a similar painting of Agostino Masucci. The frescos of the vault were covered with a new cycle of paintings. These were removed in 1992-1993 when the original frescos of Giovanni da San Giovanni were revealed and restored by Bruno Zanardi except one scene where the 18th-century layer was retained.

== Description ==
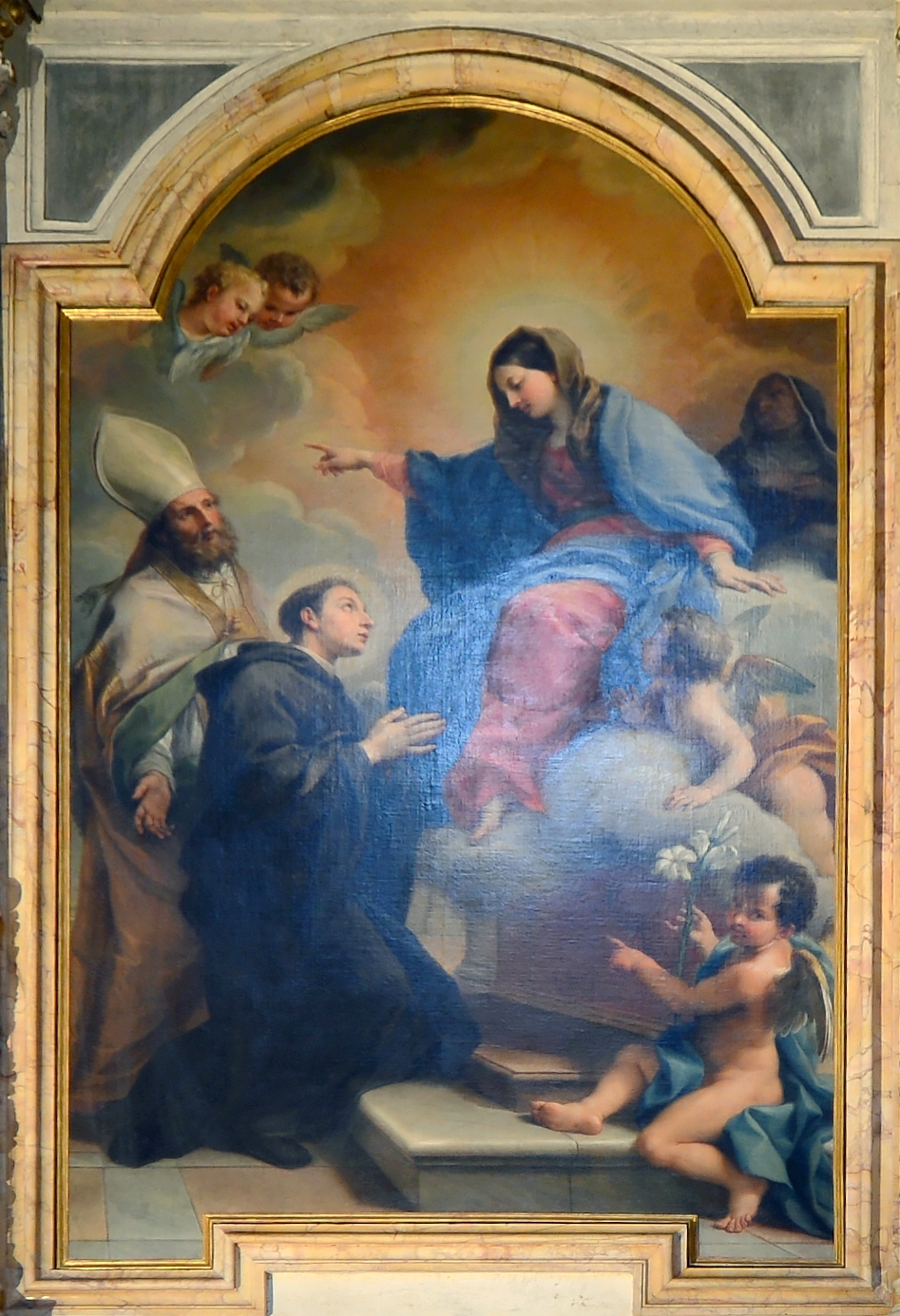
The altarpiece by Agostino Masucci

The interior of the chapel is covered with a rich white and gold stucco decoration which also extends over the outer surface of the entrance arch. The original Renaissance half-columns were embellished with Ionic stucco capitals with festoons and angel heads. The keystone of the arch is an escutcheon with crossed branches of lilies, a star and bread rolls (the traditional attributes of Saint Nicholas of Tolentino), flanked by two stucco half-figures holding garlands of fruit. The soffit of the entrance arch is decorated with angel heads, the dove of the Holy Ghost and decorative relief panels.

The main altarpiece shows The Virgin with Saint Augustine and Nicholas of Tolentino. The huge Baroque painting is a late work of Agostino Masucci, a successful follower of Carlo Maratta, from around 1750. It replaced a previous painting by Giovanni da San Giovanni depicting the same subject which was mentioned by Giovanni Baglione in his 1642 biography of Italian artists. (The previous altarpiece was recently identified as a painting in the Church of Sant'Agostino in Anagni.) The young Saint Nicholas of Tolentino is dressed as an Augustinian friar in black habit, kneeling before an altar with hands clasped in prayer. He is presented to the Virgin by Saint Augustine wearing episcopal robes and a mitre. The Virgin has descended from heaven on a throne of clouds poised above the altar, and she is accompanied by a retinue of putti, one of them holding a branch of lilies, the traditional attribute of Saint Nicholas. The older female saint behind the Virgin could be identified as Saint Monica, Augustine's mother. "The style with which the artist expresses himself in the realization of this work is noble and solemn. The figures are exalted by the monumentality of the upwards perspective and the wide gestures", wrote Maria Grazia Branchetti.

The altarpiece is framed by a sumptuous gold and white stucco aedicule with fluted Corinthian columns and a segmented, broken pediment which is crowned by the symbol of the Holy Spirit, a shell with garlands of fruit and two putti. The frieze has a decoration of acanthus tendrils and two winged mythological figurines flanking a six-pointed star. The antependium of the altar is a modern stone slab with a bronze relief of Saint Francis and the Wolf of Gubbio made by Goffredo Verginelli.

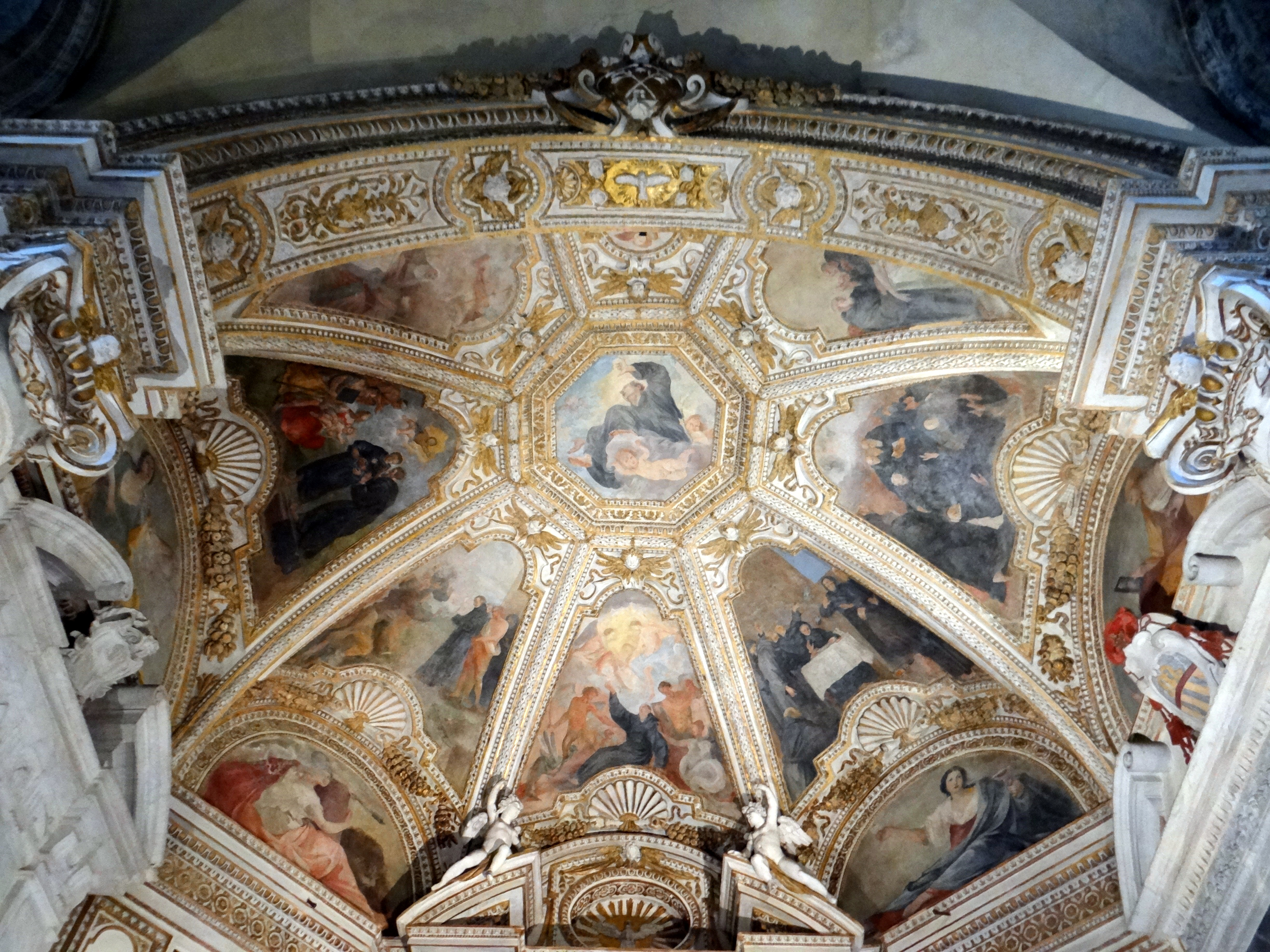
The frescos of vault by Giovanni da San Giovanni

The frescos on the vault display The Story of Saint Nicholas of Tolentino painted by Giovanni da San Giovanni in 1623-27. The scenes are set in a richly detailed white and gold stucco frame and the eight panels are crowned with angel heads and ribbons. The central octagonal panel illusionistically opens toward the sky like an oculus; here the fresco displays the Glory of Saint Nicholas, the saint ascending to heaven among angels, one of them holding a lily. The original frescos of Giovanni da San Giovanni were hidden under the coarse 18th-century repainting until 1993. Although they were brought to light, the paintings remain in a precarious state and many of the finer details and the original colours were irretrievably lost. The 7 scenes are as follows (in clockwise order):

1) Episode from the life of Saint Nicholas

2) Death of Saint Nicholas (seriously damaged)

3) Saint Nicholas revives two roasted pigeons

4) Temptation of Saint Nicholas

5) Saint Nicholas distributes bread rolls to the sick

6) Saint Nicholas transforms the bread into roses (the only fresco whose 18th-century version was retained)

7) A miracle of Saint Nicholas (the 18th-century layer was totally different)

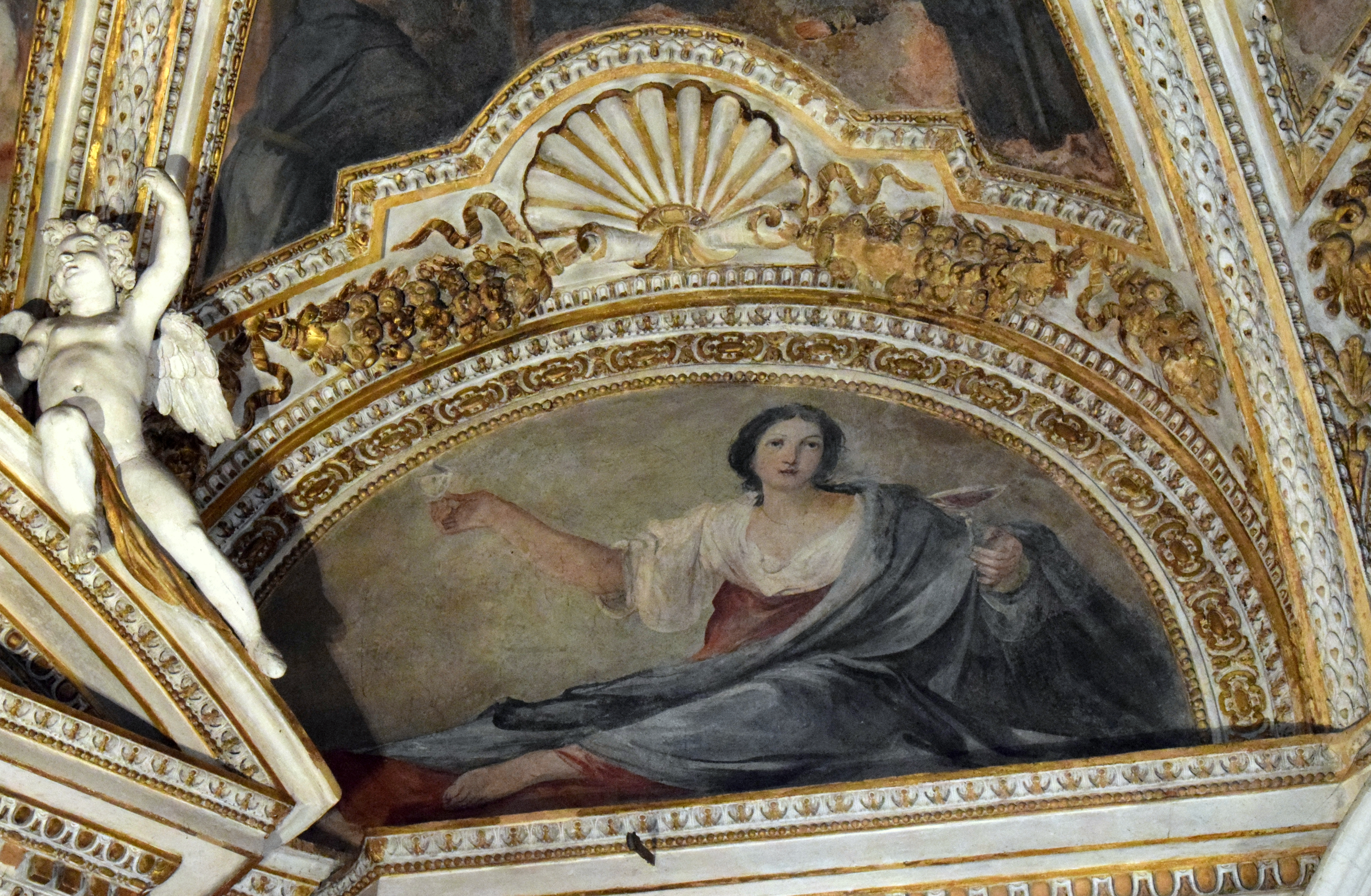
The Allegory of Temperance

The frescos depict two of the gentle miracles that made the Augustinian saint so beloved through the ages. Once when he was ill, the prior insisted that he should eat some meat although Nicholas was a vegetarian. He obeyed and touched the roast pigeons on the plate but the birds came to life and flew away. Another time he was caught by the prior taking too much food to the poor, but the bread hidden in his sleeves turned into roses. The scene where he distributes the blessed rolls, called Saint Nicholas' bread to the sick emphasizes his care for the ailing. Like many other saints he was frequently harassed and tempted by the Devil with apparitions (fourth scene).

The frescos of the lunettes show the four cardinal virtues, Justice, Fortitude, Temperance and Prudence. They are set in semicircular panels with white and gold stucco frames decorated with garlands, shells and ribbons. The frescos were painted by Giovanni da San Giovanni and like the ceiling they had been covered with a layer of 18th-century repainting until 1993 when they were restored. The female personifications can be identified by the usual attributes: Justice - scale and sword; Fortitude - lion, column, helmet, mace; Temperance - glass of wine, chalice (?); Prudence - mirror, snake. In case of The Allegory of Temperance the 18th-century layer was totally different, depicting an angel mixing water with wine and the personification holding a bridle. The Allegory of Prudence was also heavily repainted, the 18th-century version was showing an additional angel.

The entrance of the chapel is barred by a marble balustrade with richly carved wooden doors that are decorated with the coat-of-arms of Cardinal Mellini (the letter M and diagonal stripes).

== Tombs ==
Giovanni Battista Mellini

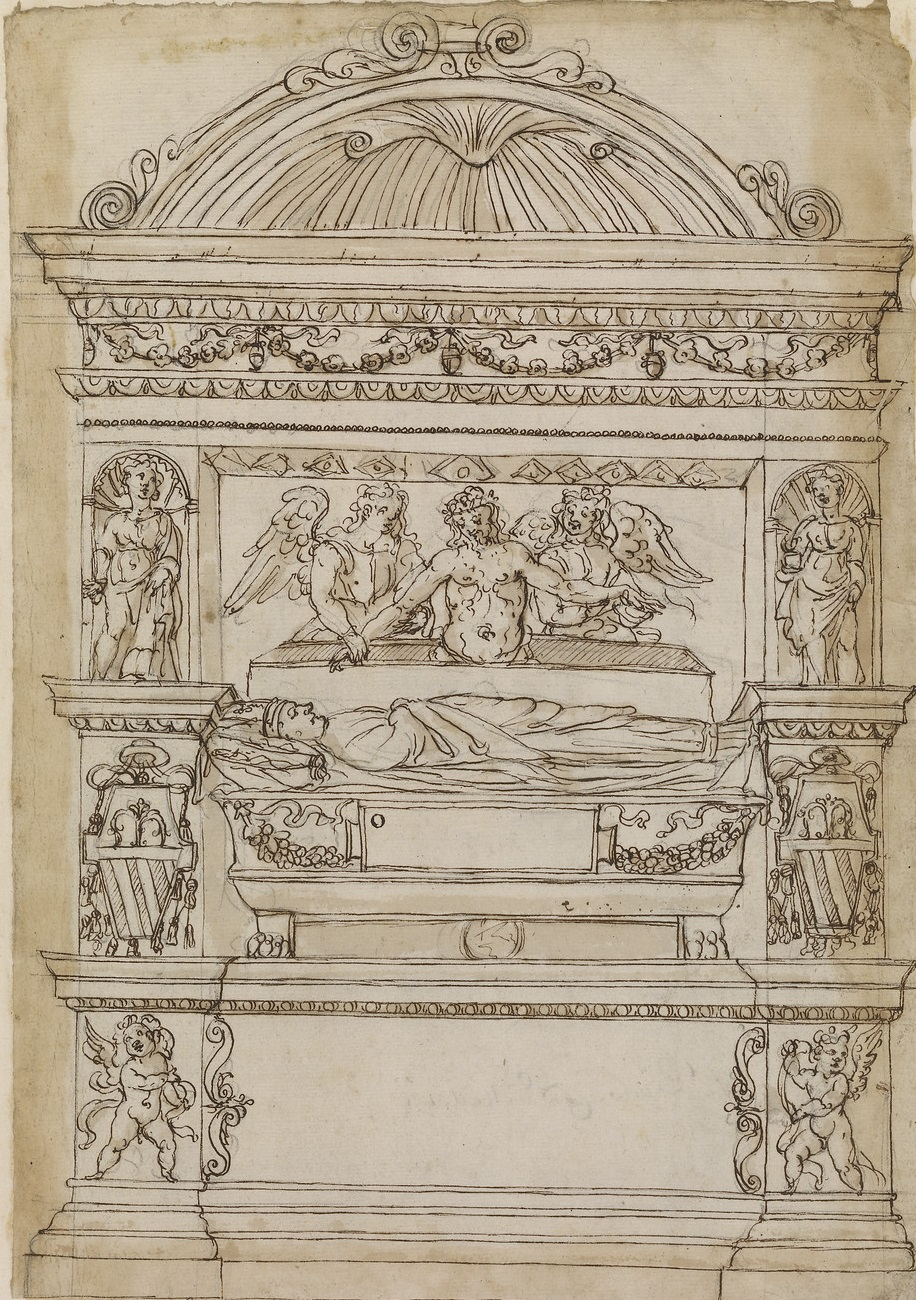
Drawing in the Royal Library which shows the original form of Giovanni Mellini's tomb

The oldest monumental tomb in the chapel is the funeral monument of Cardinal Giovanni Battista Mellini (died 1478), the Bishop of Urbino and the younger brother of Pietro Mellini. Giovanni Battista played an important part in the reconstruction of Saint Peter's Basilica during the reign of Pope Sixtus IV. The funeral inscription mentions his mission as papal legate to Milan in 1477. The monument was dismantled by Cardinal Savio Mellini in 1698 who appropriated the architectural frame for his own tomb and placed the effigy of his forefather in front of the new monument. This effigy lies on a bier decorated with richly handled fruits and flowers. The drapery on the figure runs in one sweep from head to foot. A 17th-century drawing in Windsor Castle preserved the original appearance of the tomb. Above the effigy there was a relief of Christ, the Man of Sorrows, being raised by angels from his tomb. The base of monument was decorated with the figures of two cherubs and the top was crowned with a shell pediment.

Pietro Mellini

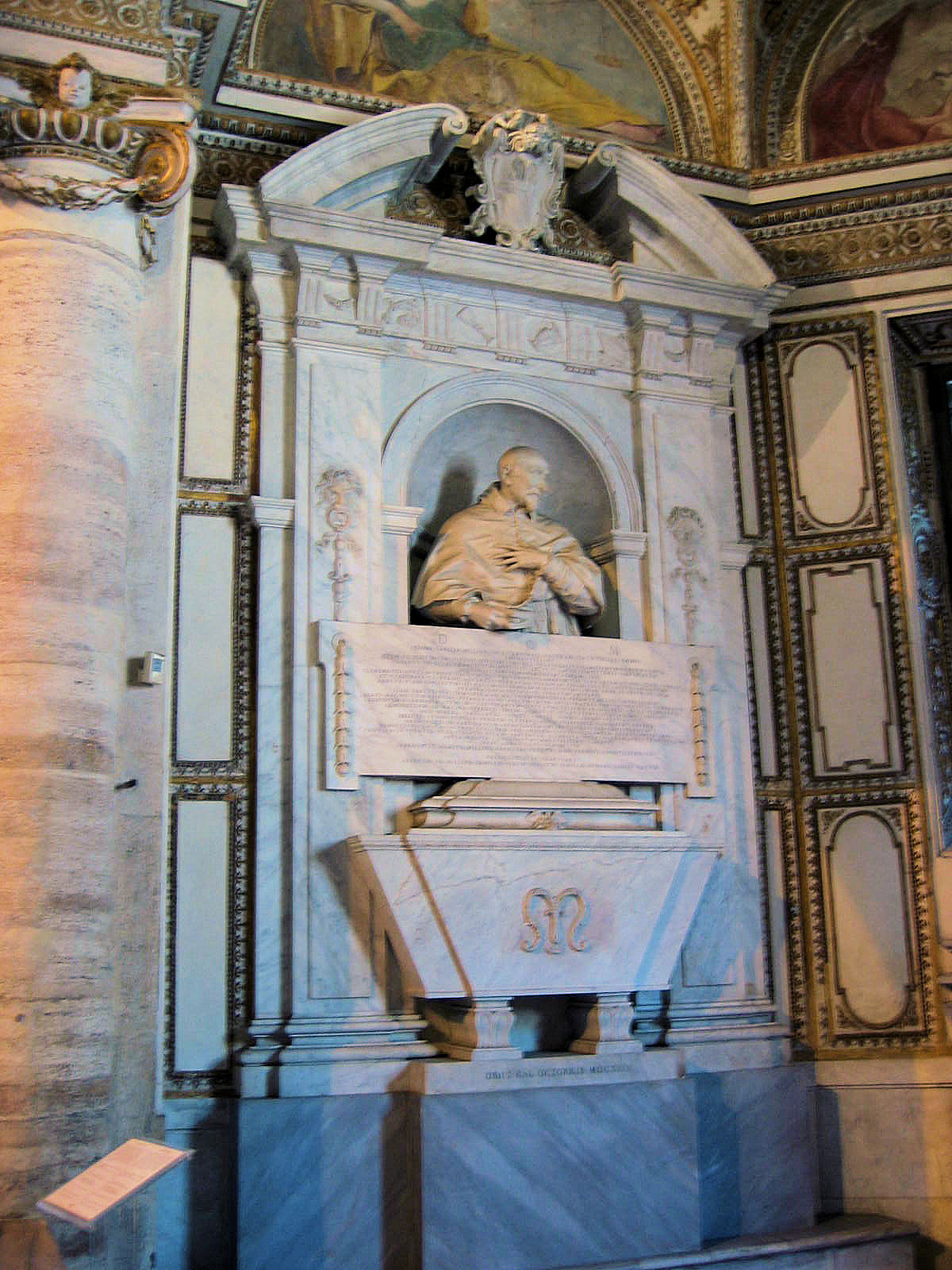
The funeral monument of Giovanni Garzia Mellini by Algardi

The tomb of Pietro Mellini (died 1483) is located under the 17th-century monument of Mario Mellini. The quattrocento tomb shows a Tuscan influence. It is sometimes attributed to Giovanni Dalmata. The effigy of the great jurist is "a simple figure of great dignity, such as marked the man in his own lifetime". The face looks like a trustworthy portraiture and the folds of the drapery are realistic. The supports of the bier are decorated with carved ornaments. The sculpture shows a strong similarity to the figure of Raffaello della Rovere in the crypt of the Church of Santi Apostoli, Rome. The monument was once of the same type as the tomb of Marcantonio Albertoni and Giovanni della Rovere, both in this church, but it was truncated.

Francesco Mellini

The oldest brother of Pietro and Giovanni Battista, Francesco Mellini, Augustinian friar and the Bishop of Senigallia, is buried under a tomb slab in the chapel. He was suffocated by the crowd at the conclave of 1431. The relief of the slab shows the full-length image of the Bishop, surrounded by a frame of trefoil arch supported on slender twisted columns with the family coats-of-arms in the upper corners.

Giovanni Garzia Mellini

The tomb of Cardinal Giovanni Garzia Mellini (died 1629), the vicar general of Rome was created by Alessandro Algardi in 1637-38. The monument was erected by the cardinal's nephews, Mario and Urbano Mellini but only after a conspicuously long time their uncle's death. The centrepiece of the monument is the white Carrara marble bust of the Cardinal in a niche which shows him leaning forward and turning towards the altar, his left hand on his heart and his right hand holding a prayer book. The work was much admired in Algardi's day because it conveys a sense of Baroque piety combined with expressive realism and brilliantly observed, technically perfect details. The monument itself is a classicising aedicule framed by flat pilasters with masks and crowned by a broken segmental pediment with the Mellini coat-of-arms in a conch. The big letter M, the main symbol of the family, recurs on the trapezoid sarcophagus (and the other Baroque tombs in the chapel). The Doric frieze is decorated with ecclesiastical objects (crozier, chalice, holy vessels and mitre). The voluminous epitaph follows the stages of Giovanni Garzia's prestigious career from his youth until his death, including his important diplomatic missions for Pope Paul V to Philip III of Spain and the warring Habsburg brothers of Emperor Rudolf II and Matthias.

Urbano and Mario Mellini

The tombs of Urbano (†1660) and Mario Mellini (†1673), distinguished soldiers of the Papal State, were placed in front of the windows. The monuments were attributed to Alessandro Algardi, and Wittkower claims that the bust of Mario "obviously echoes Bernini's Francisco I of Este and must date from after 1650". The bust on Urbano's tomb was made well before 1660, probably in the mid-1630s, and its original designation is not clear, but it was suggested that Algardi made it as a model for the Cardinal's portrait. The monuments are almost identical with subtle differences. Both consist a trapezoid sarcophagus and the bust of the deceased which is set between volutes. The sarcophagus is decorated with the letter M on Urbano's tomb. The inscription states that the tomb of Mario Mellini was built by his son, Cardinal Savio Mellini "for the best of fathers". The bust was probably made by the workshop of Pierre-Étienne Monnot, the sculptor who created Savio Mellini's tomb.

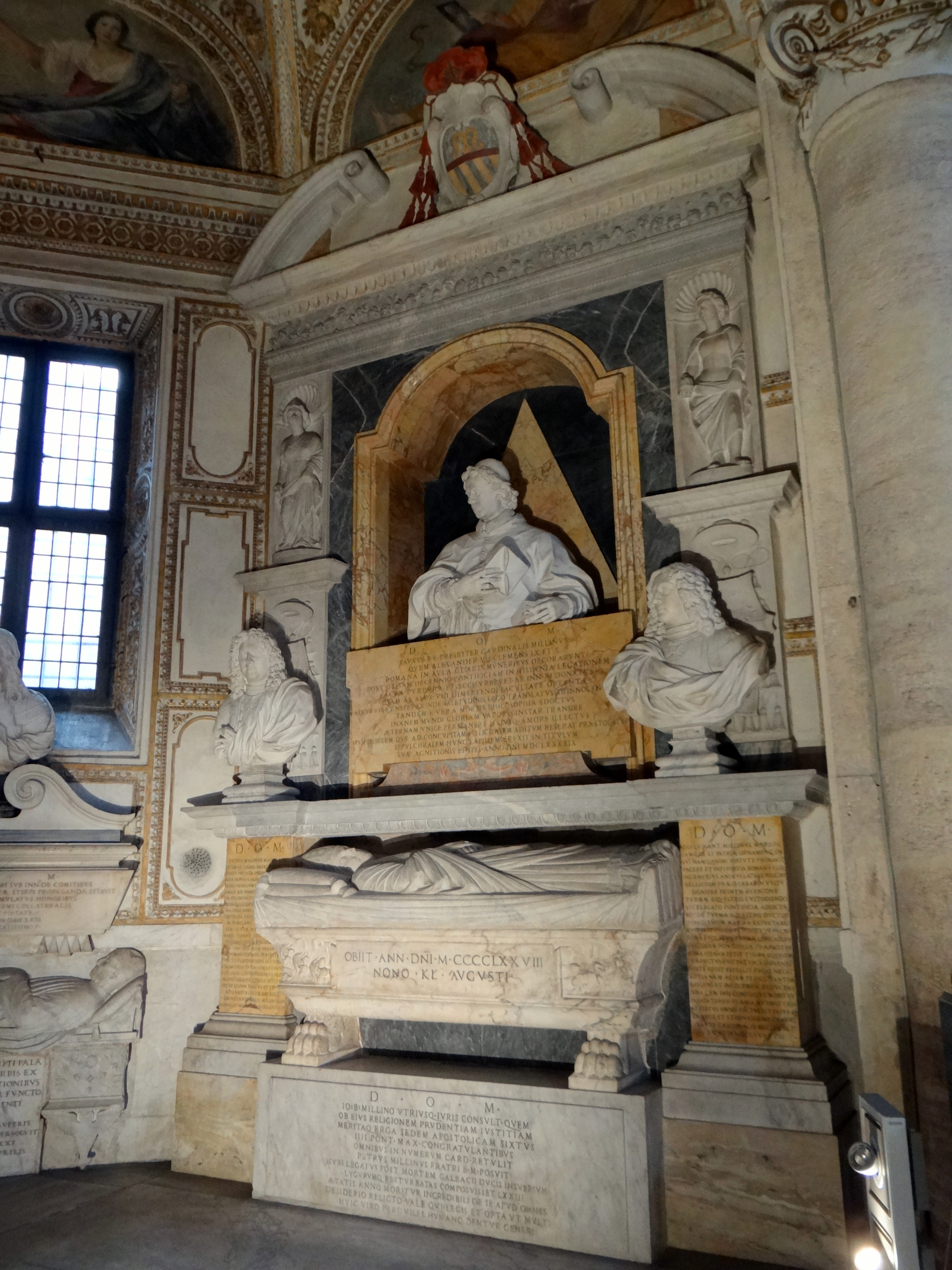
The monument of Savo Mellini (with the tomb of Giovanni Battista Mellini)

Savio Mellini

The tomb of Cardinal Savio Mellini, the Bishop of Nepi and Sutri on the right hand wall of the chapel was made by Pierre-Étienne Monnot, a French sculptor who worked in Rome. The strange monument was superimposed upon the older tomb of Giovanni Battista Mellini. The architectural frame of the Quattrocento tomb was partly reused. Two small reliefs with the personifications of the virtues and the cardinal's insignia on the side pilasters belong to that period.

The monument imitates the more famous tomb of Giovanni Garzia Mellini on the left side of the chapel. The centrepiece is the marble bust of the Cardinal in a similar pose than his counterpart opposite. He looks toward the altar holding a book and a biretta. His head is covered by a zucchetto. The bust is placed in a deep rectangular niche which is clad with black and yellow slabs. The characteristically colourful Late Baroque composition is enhanced by a yellow marble inscription plate. The monument is crowned by a broken segmental pediment with the cardinal's coloured coat-of-arms. The French sculptor signed his work on the biretta of the bust: MONNO(T) F(E)CIT.

The very long funerary inscription mentions fact the Cardinal Savio has served as papal nuncio in Spain for ten years, and later he was the cardinal priest of the Basilica of Santa Maria del Popolo. According to the inscription his tomb was erected in 1699 (i. e. during his lifetime). A will dated to 9 September 1698 states that the statues of the tomb had been completed but the monument was still unfinished at the time. The cardinal planned his own tomb and apparently lived to see it erected because he died in 1701.

The two flanking busts on the ledge are sometimes attributed to Monnot but according to Enggass they were made by another hand. They portray the Cardinal's deceased brothers, Pietro Mellini (†1694), general of the papal army, and Paolo Antonio Mellini (†1683), commander of the papal troops at the Battle of Vienna against the Ottomans where he lost his life.

Mario Mellini (†1756)

The large tombstone (in the floor) of Cardinal Mario Mellini (died 1756) is inlaid with a mosaic of colourful stones. The inscription says that Mellini was minister plenipotentiary at the Holy See of Maria Theresa, Empress and Queen of Hungary "in the most difficult times", and his tomb was erected by his nieces, Anna Serlupi and Giulia Falconieri and his nephew, Antonio Casali in 1760. The epitaph is set in a Baroque crest which is flanked by green olive branches and surmounted by the coat-of-arms of the cardinal. The allegorical figures of Prudence (left with mirror in her hand) and Fortitude (right with sword) are reclining on the top of the crest. The sepulchre was created by the mosaicist Carlo Lecchini after the design of architect Giuseppe (?) Ferroni.

== Gallery ==
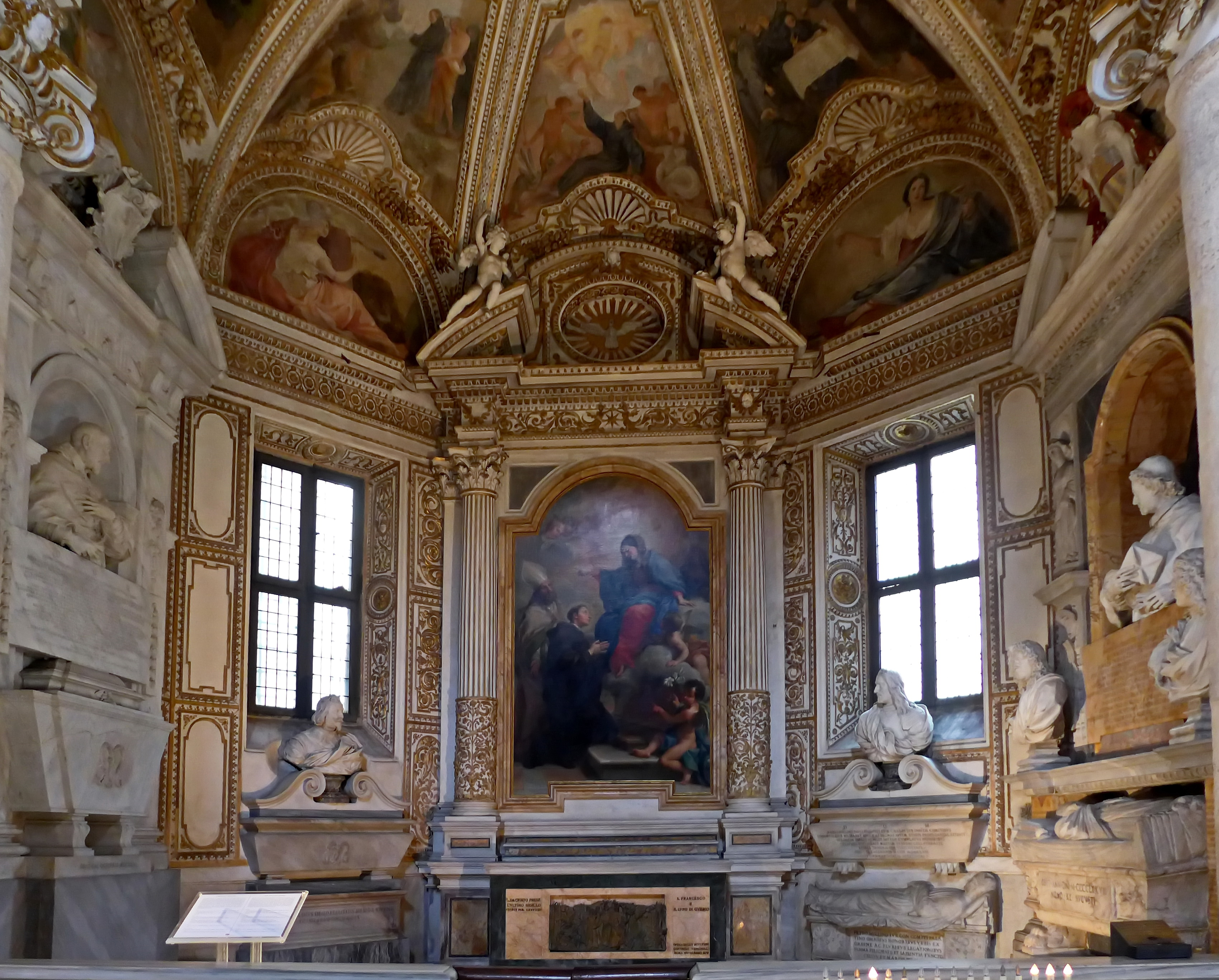
General view

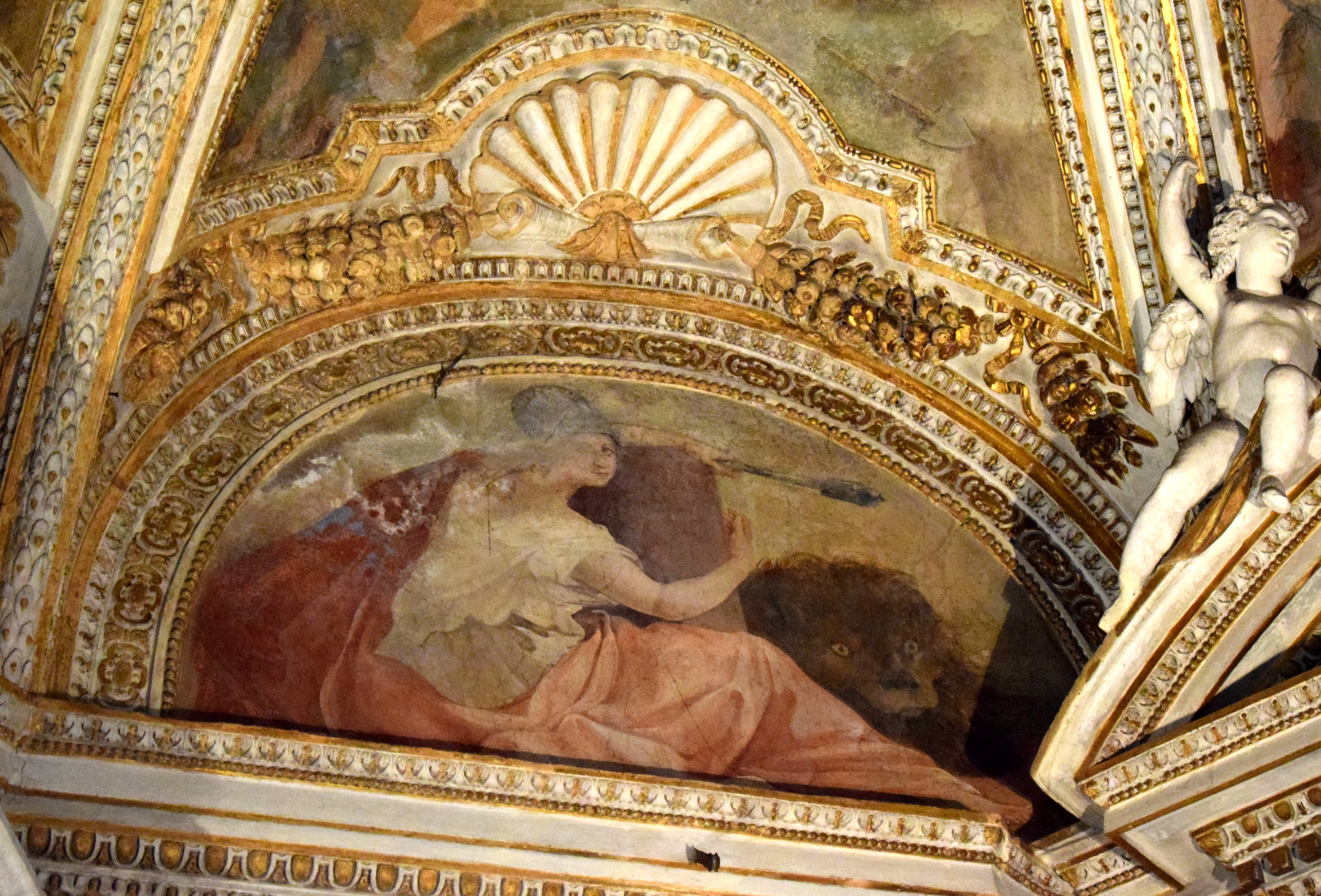
Fortitude

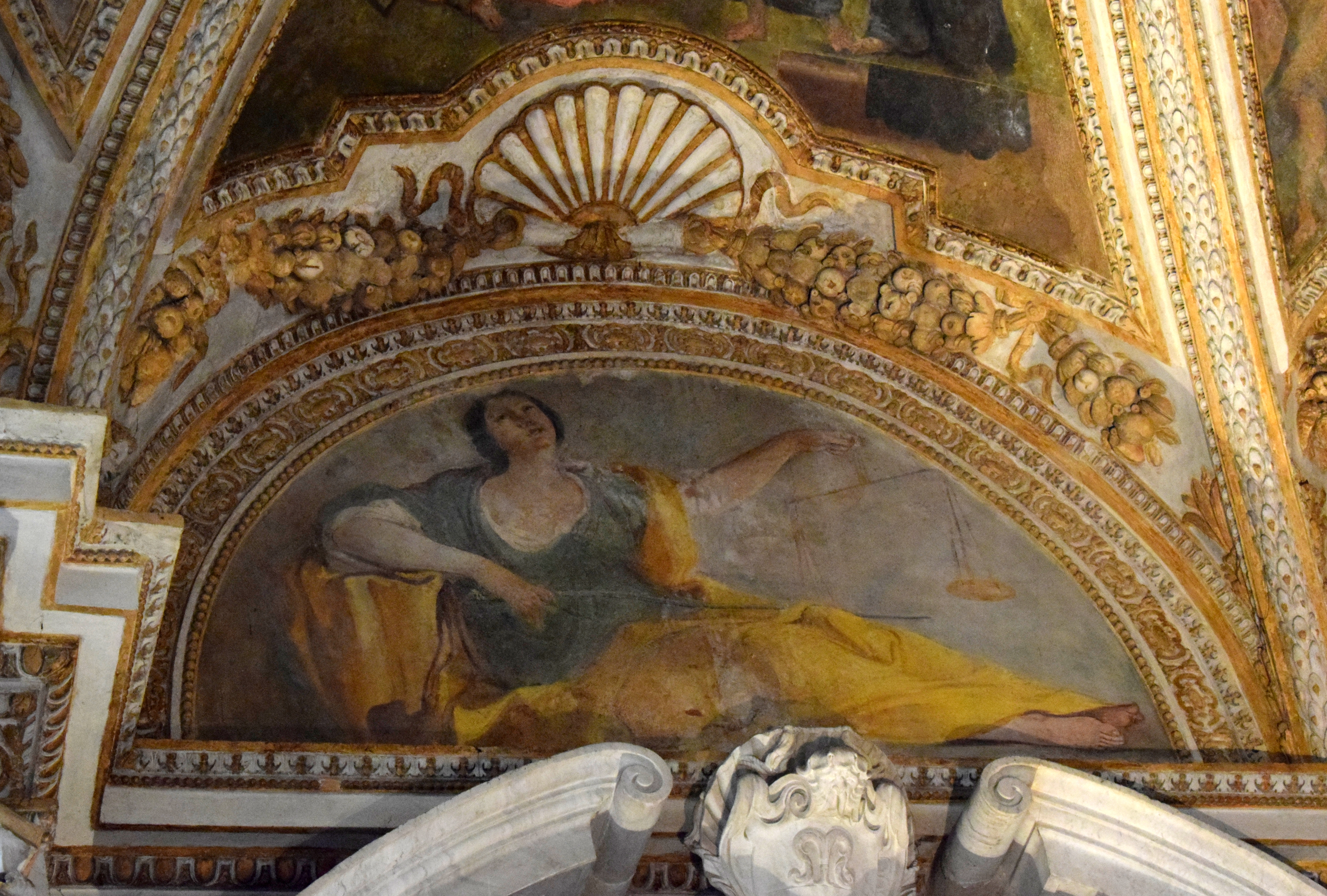
Justice

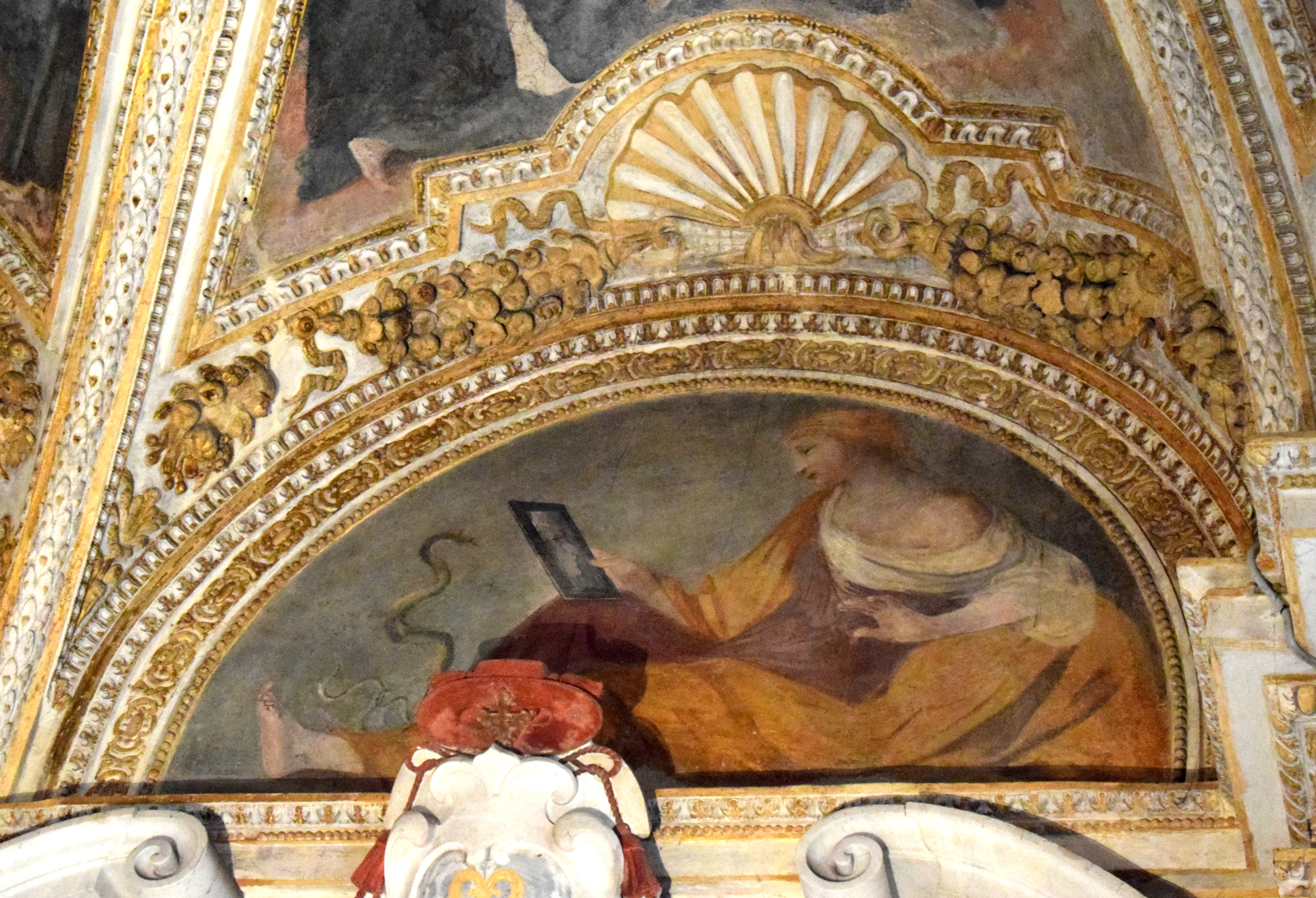
Prudence

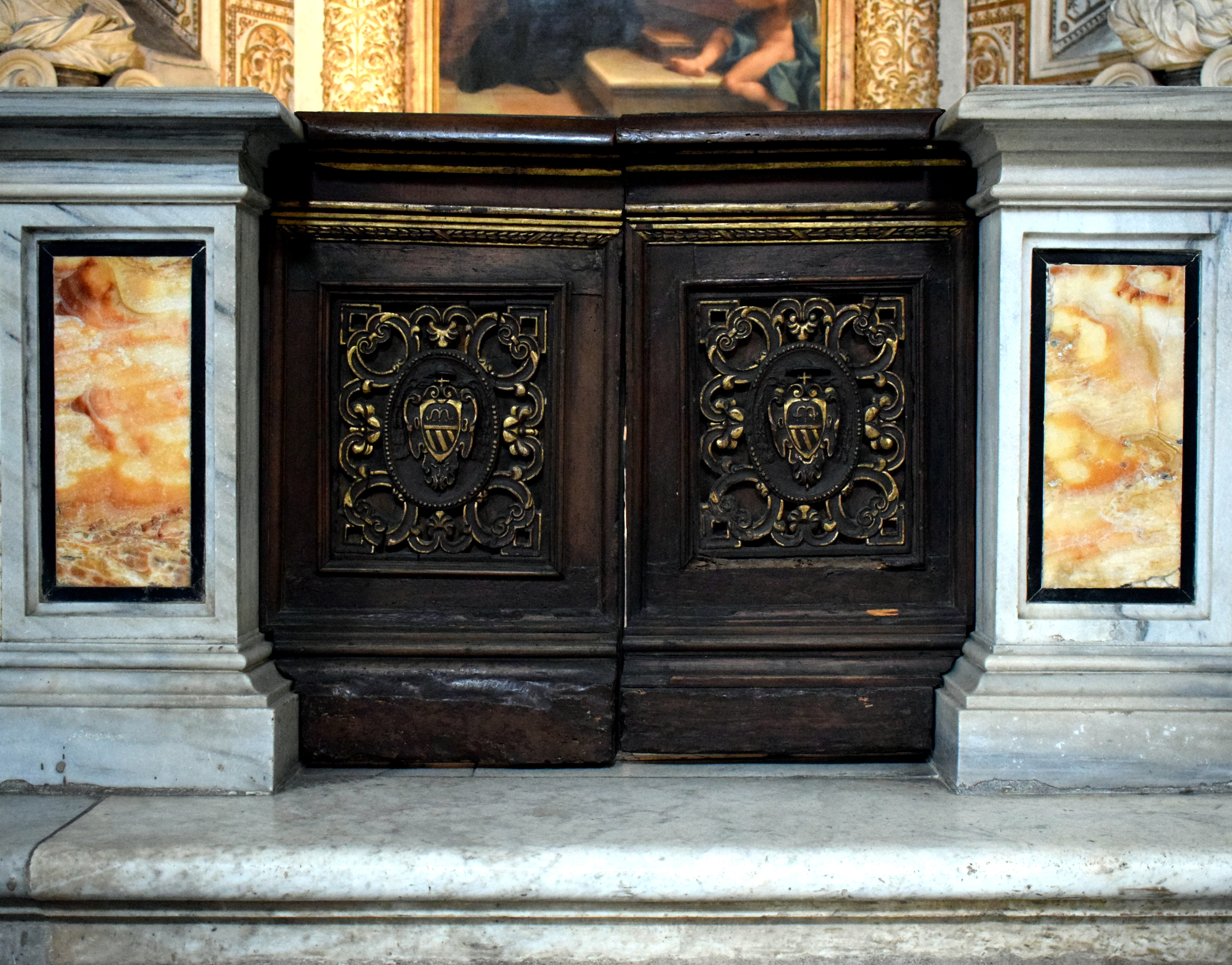
Wooden doors with the Mellini coat-of-arms

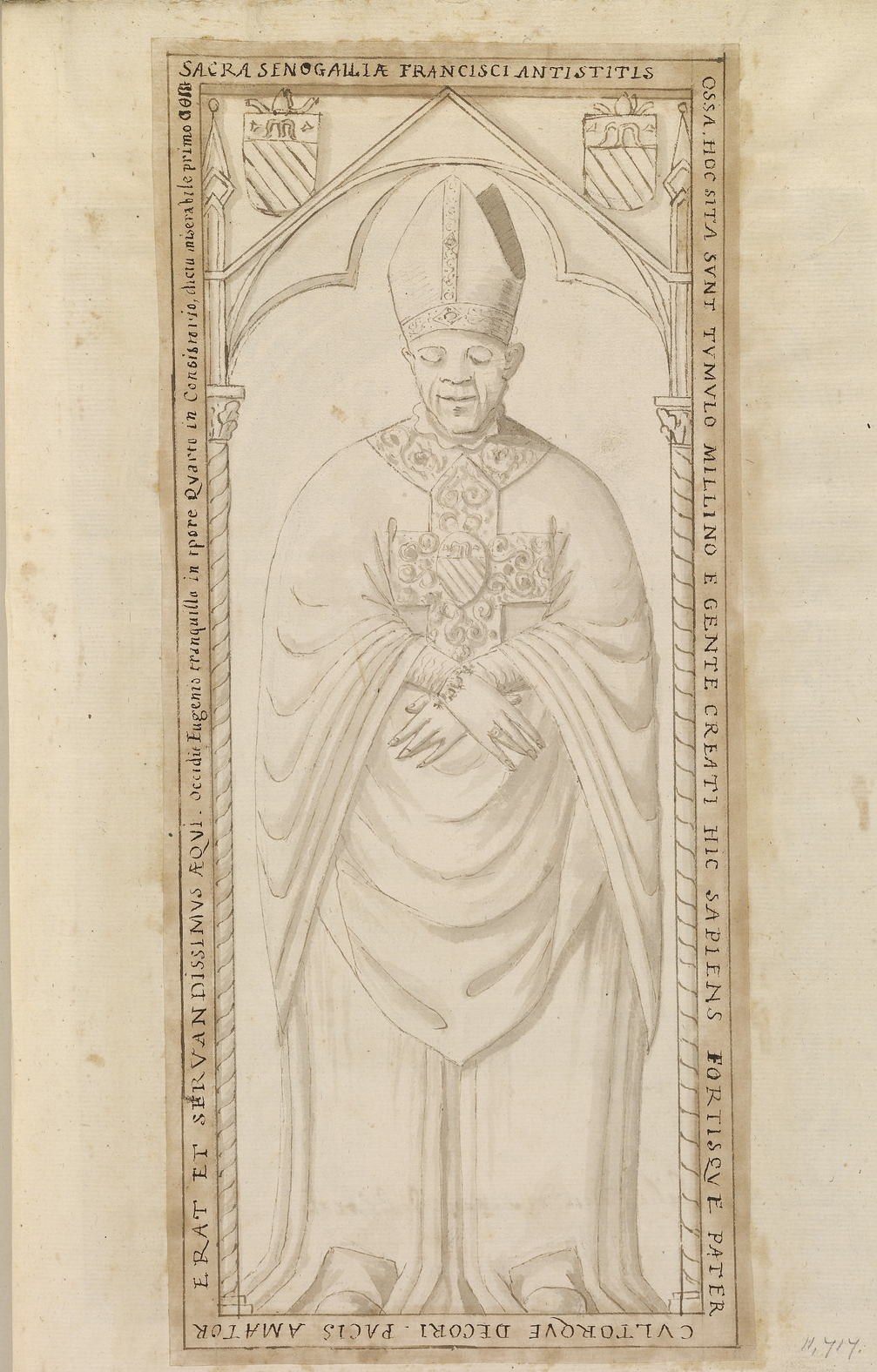
Tombstone of Francesco Mellini

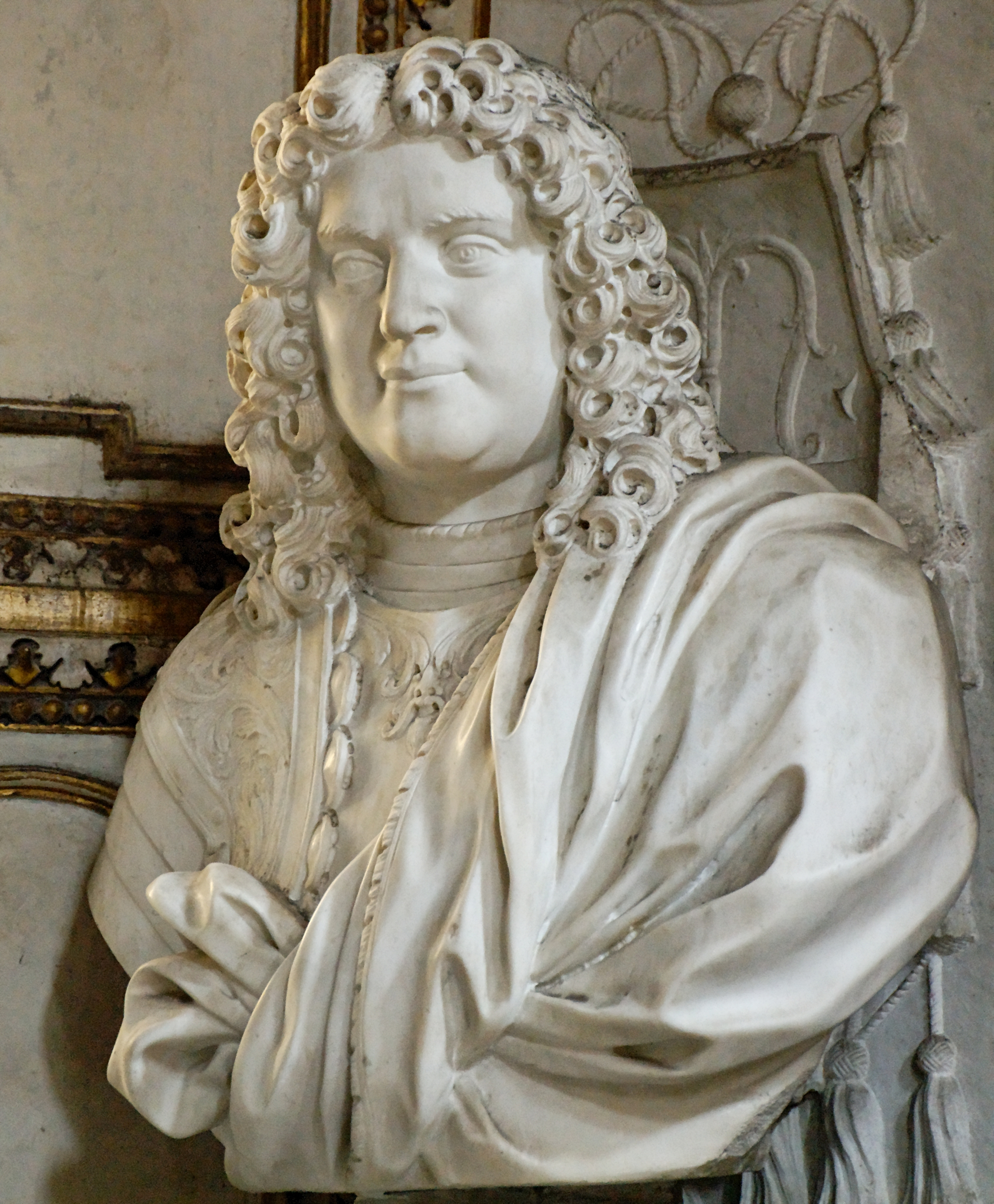
The bust of Pietro Mellini, on the tomb of Savo Mellini by Monnot

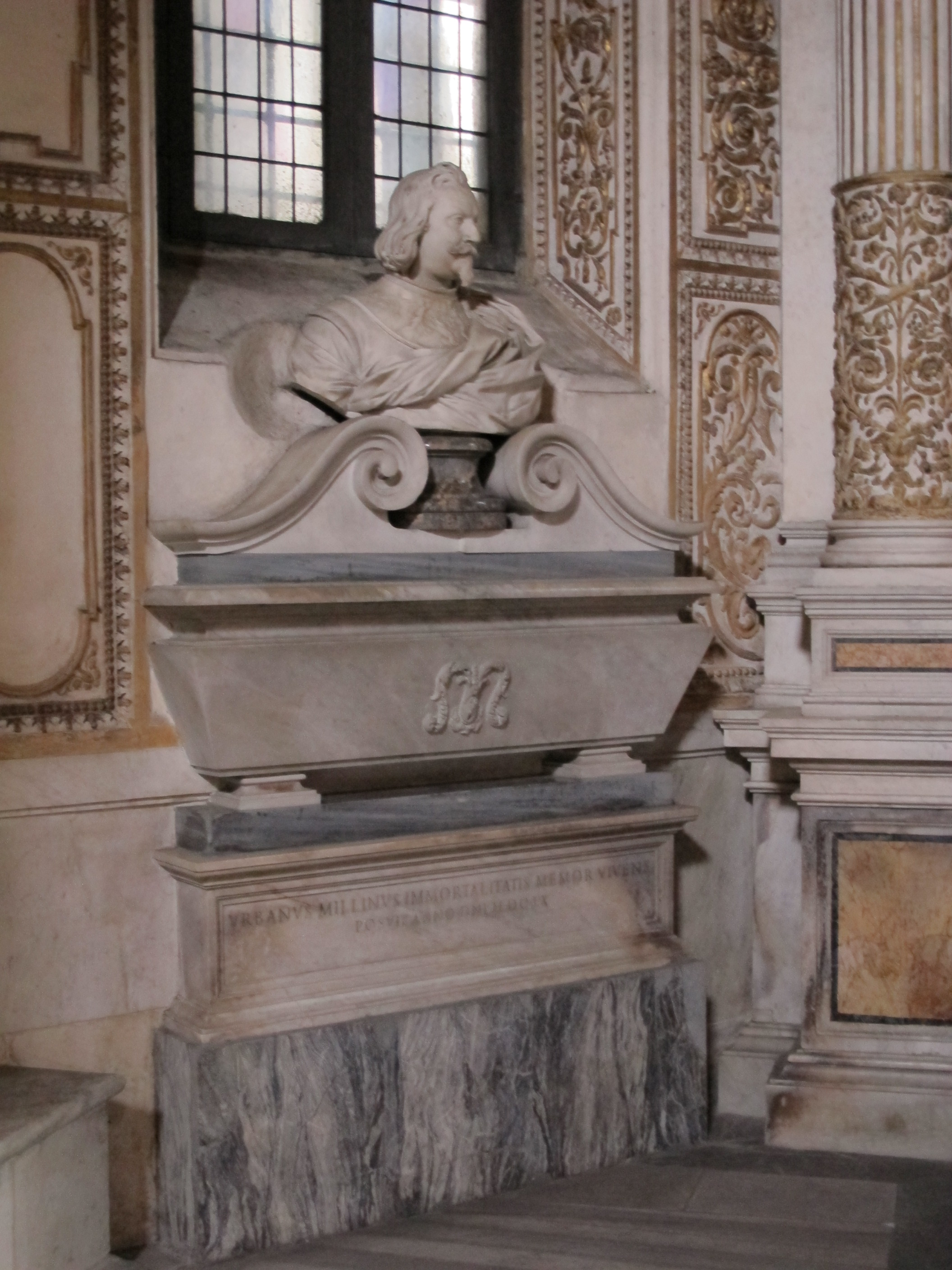
The tomb of Urbano Mellini by Algardi

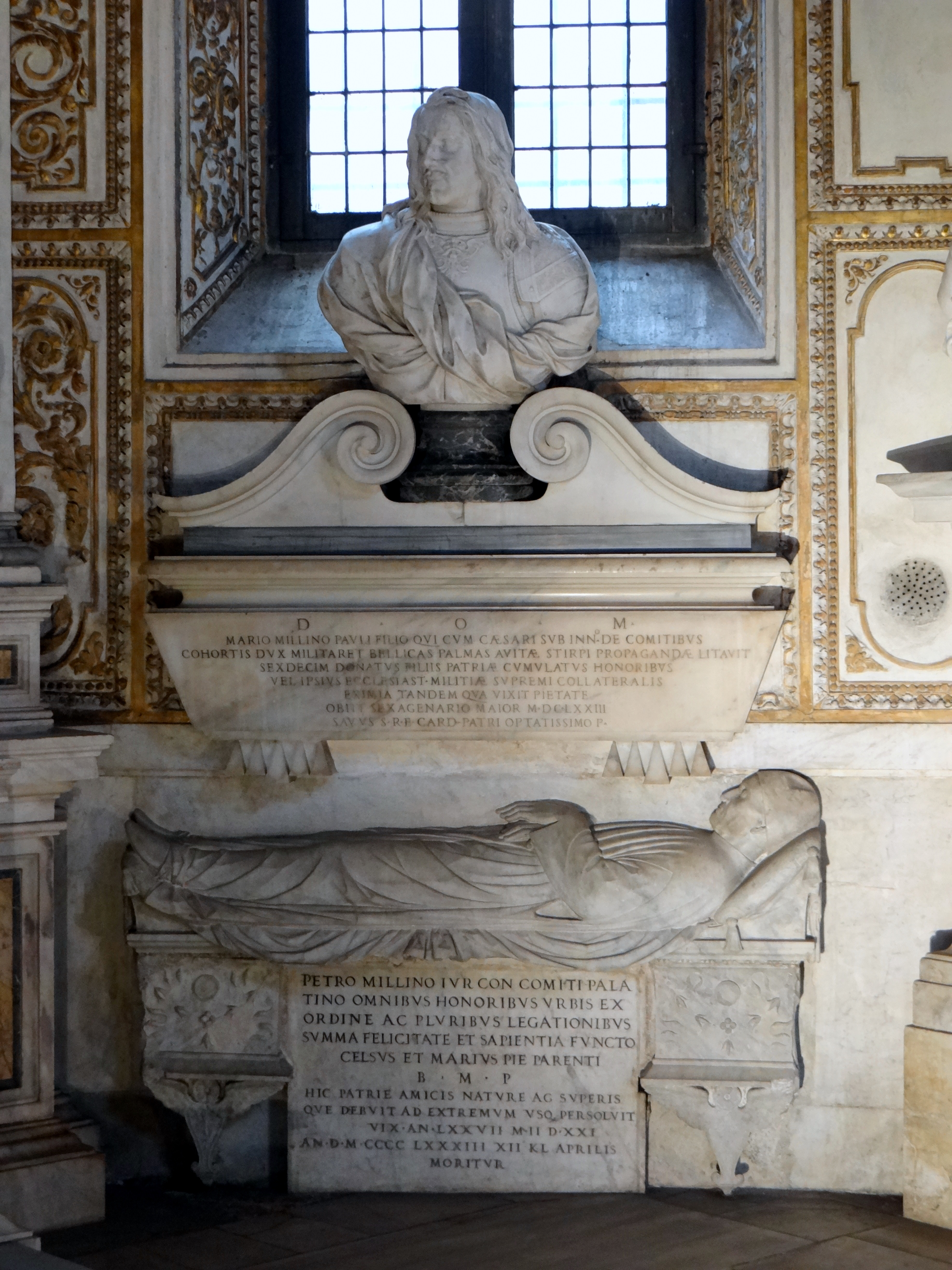
The tombs of Mario and Pietro Mellini

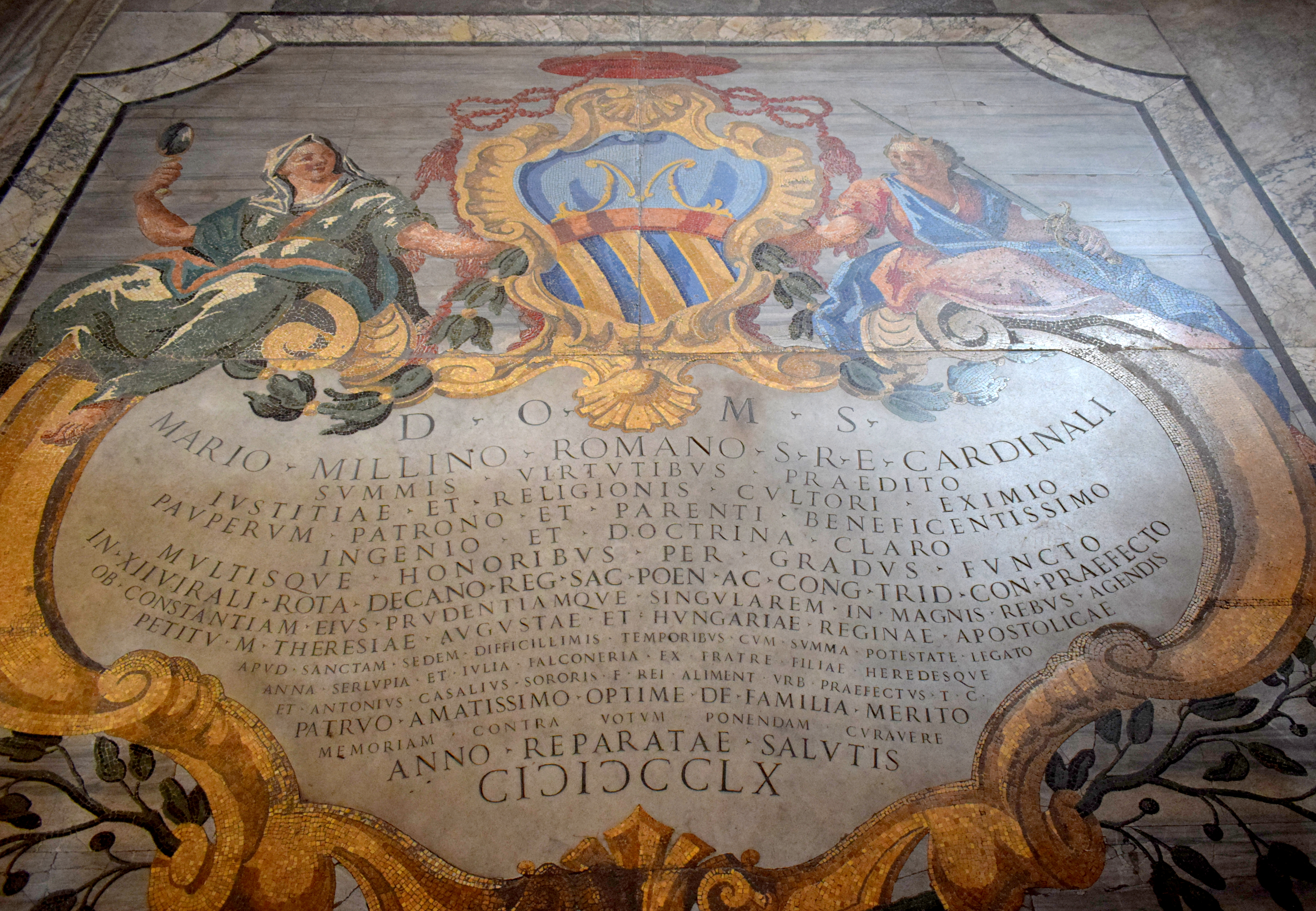
The inlaid tombstone of Cardinal Mario Mellini (1760)

== Bibliography ==
- Gerald S. Davies: Renascence. The Sculptured Tombs of the Fifteenth Century in Rome, E. P. Dutton and Company, New York, 1916
- Cristina Ruggero: Monumenta Cardinalium. Studien zur barocken und spätbarocken Skulptur am Beispiel römischer Kardinalsgrabmäler (1650-1750 ca.), Inaugural-Dissertation zur Erlangung der Doktorwürde der Philosophischen Fakultäten der Albert-Ludwigs-Universität zu Freiburg i. Br., 3 Vols, 2003/04
