= Pierre-Étienne Monnot =

French sculptor (1657-1733)

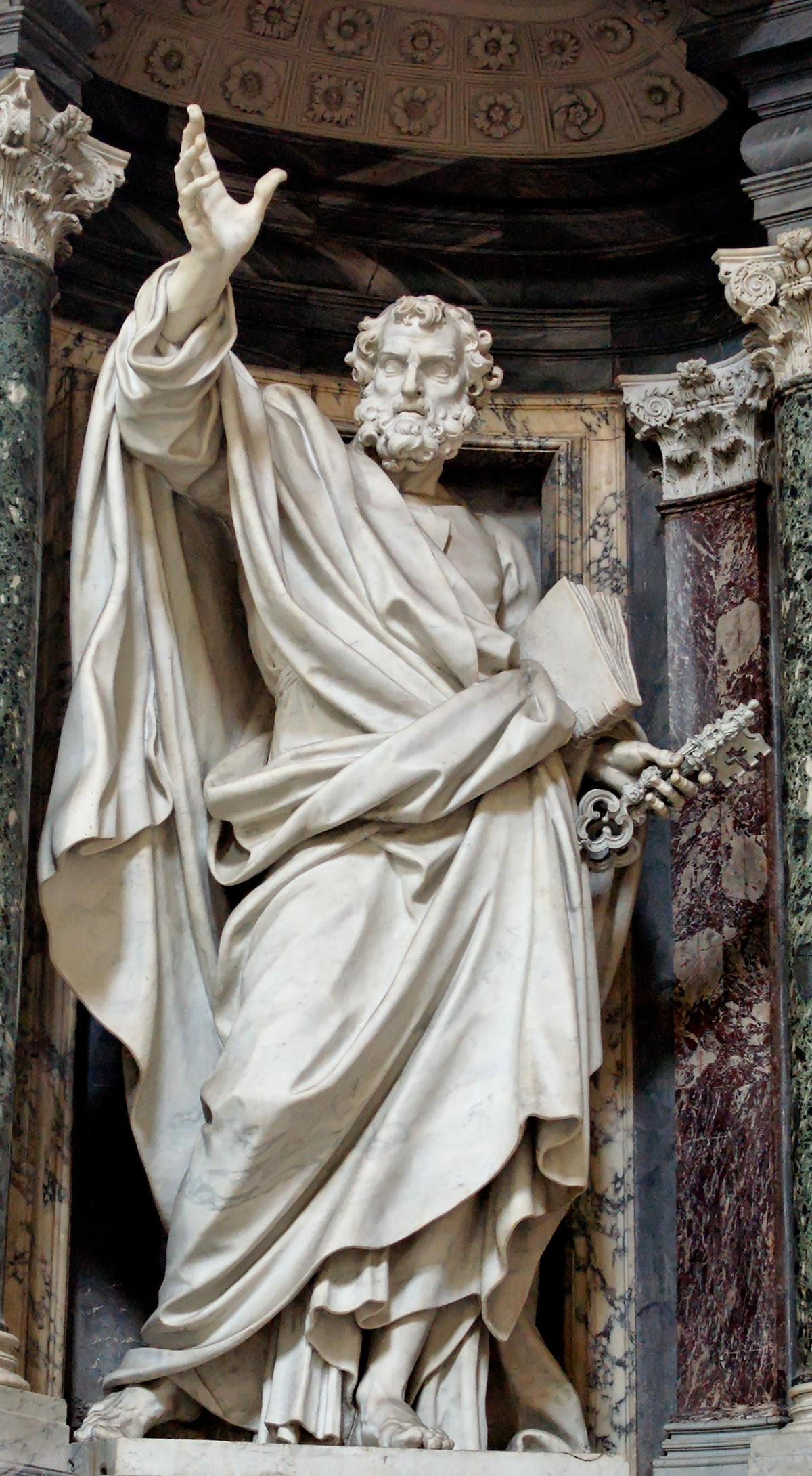
Saint Peter, Basilica of St. John Lateran

Pierre-Étienne Monnot (English: /mɒˈnoʊ/ mo-NOH, French: [pjɛʁ etjɛn mɔnɔ]; 9 August 1657 – 24 August 1733) was a French sculptor from the Franche-Comté who settled in Rome in 1687 for the rest of his life. He was a distinguished artist working in a late-Baroque idiom for international clients. In Italian sources he is often referred to as Pietro Stefano Monnot, an italianised version of his name.

== Biography ==
Monnot was born at Orchamps-Vennes near Besançon in the Franche-Comté. Trained by his father, a woodcarver, he subsequently worked for Jean Dubois, a sculptor in Dijon, for a year. He then took on independent commissions for religious works in Besançon and Poligny. Monnot also visited Paris on at least two occasions, probably 1679–1681 and between 1684 and 1686, where he might have had contact with or worked under some of the leading sculptors working on the various enterprises of Louis XIV.

Leaving Besançon in December 1686, he arrived in Rome in February 1687, where he was introduced to an established, tightly knit community of Burgundian artists. Monnot quickly integrated into Rome's artistic circles and gained many commissions. With the main sculptures of the Saint Ignatius altar in the Church of the Gesù assigned to Pierre Le Gros the Younger and Jean-Baptiste Théodon in 1695, French sculptors in Rome became highly prized for decades to come. Monnot himself contributed a Pair of Angels holding the IHS monogramme to the Saint Ignatius altar.

Monnot's first major commission was for two marble reliefs, a Nativity and a Flight into Egypt flanking Domenico Guidi's Dream of St. Joseph for the right transept altar in Santa Maria della Vittoria. Here, as in some other pieces, Monnot was to some measure influenced by Guidi, a pupil of Alessandro Algardi, who had become a prominent sculptor in late 17th-century Rome.

Through his patron, Prince Livio Odescalchi, Monnot was entrusted to execute the Tomb of Pope Innocent XI for St. Peter's Basilica (1697–1704) to a design by Carlo Maratta. He was also among the select group to be commissioned with apostles of heroic scale for niches in the Basilica of Saint John Lateran.

On his last of three Grand Tours in 1699–1700, the English aristocrat John Cecil, 5th Earl of Exeter, entrusted Monnot with some major commissions. For his family seat, Burghley House, the earl ordered a relief of 'The Adoration of the Child' and portrait busts of himself and his wife, still at Burghley House. Leone Pascoli mentions five large and one small statues but the other pieces are untraced. Finally, Monnot created the couple's tomb monument with reclining lifesize figures of the earl and his countess together with two standing allegorical figures to the sides. This was shipped to England and installed in the family chapel at St Martin's Church, Stamford. The earl saw none of these works completed as he died on his return journey to England in 1700, followed into the grave by his wife in 1703.

Like all sculptors working in Rome, Monnot was called upon to restore fragmentary antiquities. Baroque restorations often took broader liberties of interpretation than eighteenth-century and later tastes permitted. Monnot restored a torso of a copy after Myron's Discobolus as a Wounded Gladiator who supports himself on his arm as he sinks to the ground; it was donated before 1734 by Pope Clement XII to the Capitoline Museums, where it remains.

=== Marmorbad ===
Monnot's masterwork is the vast complex of marble sculptures and bas-reliefs set against richly colored marble revetments of the Marmorbad ("Marble Bath") in the Orangerie at the Karlsaue in Kassel. Monnot went to Kassel in 1714, and began by executing marble portrait busts of Karl, Landgrave of Hesse-Kassel, and the Landgravine. In January 1715 the first contracts were signed concerning the new Appartement du Bain with its statuary, ten sculptures that were already completed in Rome, some of them as early as 1692, and commissioned four white marble high relief panels for the outerwalls of the pavilion, eight further relief panels for the vaulting and the portrait medallion of Karl himself. Monnot established a studio with assistants in Kassel and to help him produce the works. Renewed agreements in 1718 increased the marble relief panels to the eight that were installed, and the ensemble was inaugurated in 1729. The final two statues, Minerva and Aurora, were announced as ready by Monnot in 1731, but did not actually reach Kassel until 1734.

The architect of the garden pavilion is unknown; Monnot's mythological sculptures occupy niches in the massive central pier, and his eight large white marble high relief panels of subjects from Ovid's Metamorphoses fill the piers between arch-headed windows.

Pierre-Étienne Monnot died in Rome. One of his pupils, Bartolomeo Cavaceppi (1716–1799), was a sculptor best known as a restorer of antiquities.

== Works ==
- Tabernacle for the church at Vesoul.
- Retable for the chapel of Saint Laurent, Besançon.
- Works for the Priory of Vaux-sous-Poligny, Jura.
- Busts of Christ and of the Virgin, terracotta (Musée des Beaux-Arts, Besançon)
- Five reliefs of the Passion in lindenwood for the chapel of the Oratorians, Poligny (Hôtel de Ville, Poligny). One of them carried the date 1688, his earliest dated work.
- Nativity and The Flight into Egypt, marble high reliefs for the Capocaccia Chapel, the right transept altar of Santa Maria della Vittoria, 1695–99. The main relief of the altar is Domenico Guidi's Dream of Saint Joseph.
- Monument of Pope Innocent XI, St. Peter's, Rome, 1697–1704. Carlo Maratta presented the patron with designs for the tomb, who were revised in the execution by Monnot.
- Reliefs in Palazzo Odescalchi for prince Livio Odescalchi, nephew of Innocent XI, including his medallion portrait, 1695 (Louvre, illustration, right)
- The Holy Family, marble bas-relief, (Gemäldegalerie, Berlin)
- The Holy Families, terracotta relief, probably 1700–10, Museum of Fine Arts, Boston
- Funeral monument of Savo Mellini, 1699, Mellini Chapel, Santa Maria del Popolo.
- Bust of the 5th Earl of Exeter and his wife, Anne Cavendish, Countess of Exeter, 1701, Burghley House.
- Tomb monument for the 5th Earl of Exeter and his wife, 1700–04, Burghley family chapel at St Martin's Church, Stamford.
- Two of the monumental figures of apostles to fill Francesco Borromini's niches in San Giovanni in Laterano, Rome: St Peter, 1708 the first completed marble sculpture of the series, and St. Paul, 1708–11.
- Angels for the monument of Pope Gregory XV, Sant'Ignazio, Rome. Designed by Pierre Le Gros the Younger who also carved the majority of the monument's sculptures, c. 1709–1713.
- The Virgin Swooning over the Body of Christ at the Foot of the Cross, marble high relief, 1710. (National Gallery of Art, Washington DC)
- Sculptures and high relief panels for the Marmorbad, Karlsaue, Kassel, 1718–1731.

== Gallery ==
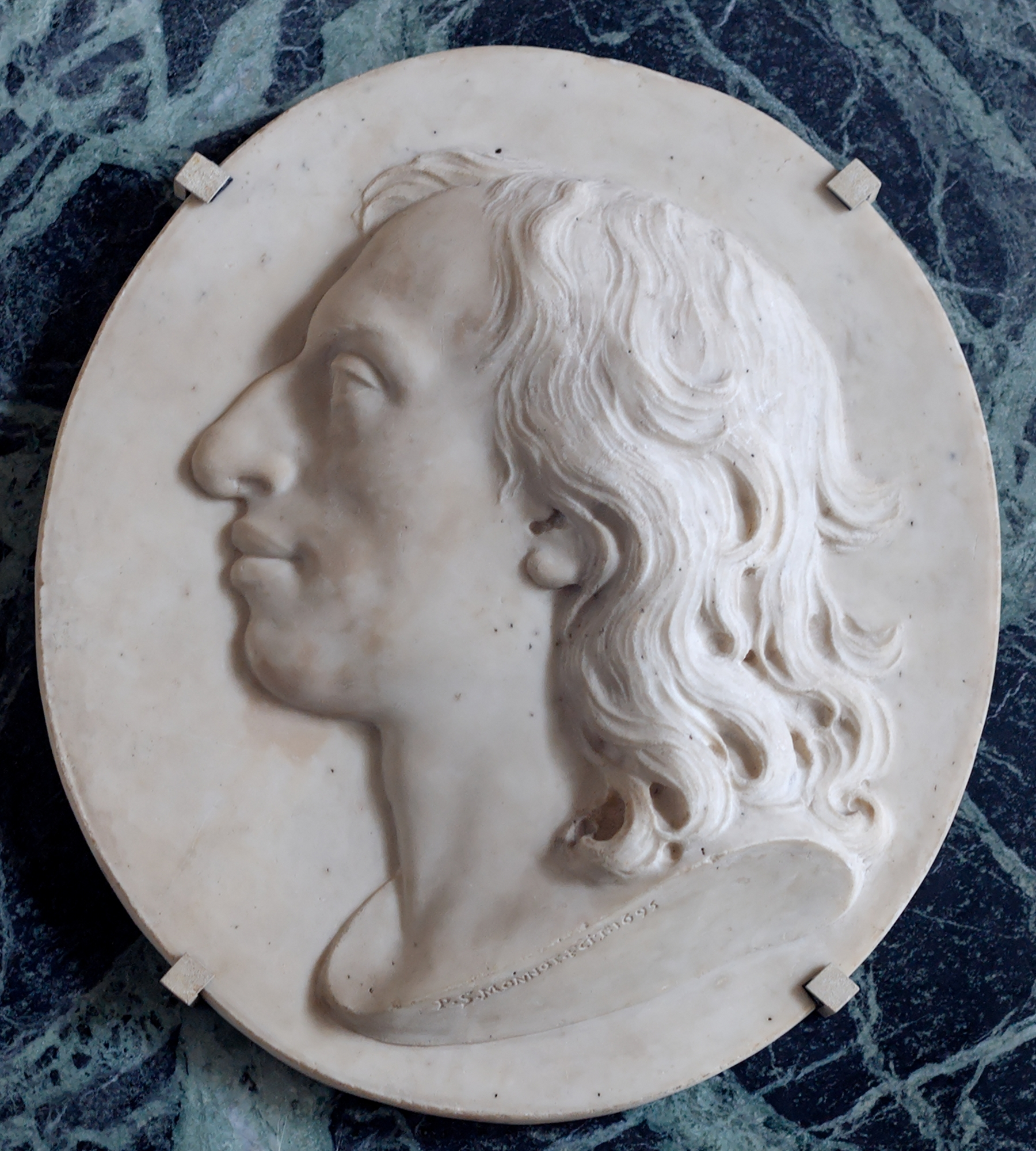
Medallion portrait of prince Livio Odescalchi, 1695

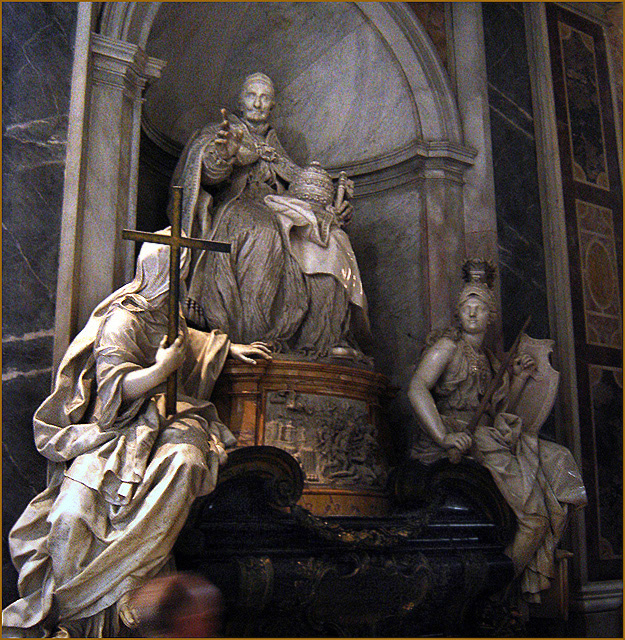
Tomb of Pope Innocent XI, Rome, St. Peter's

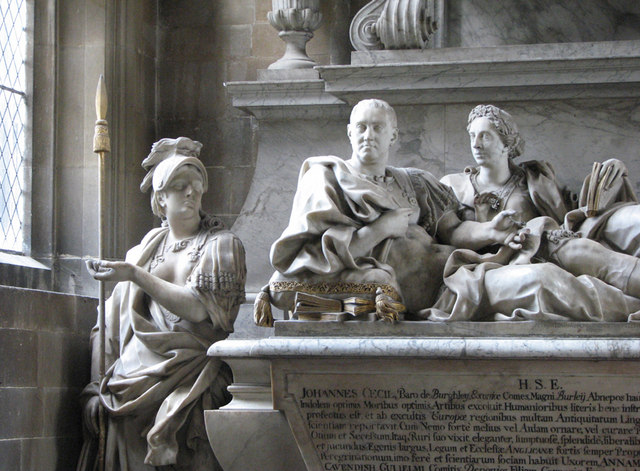
Tomb of the Earl of Exeter, Stamford, St Martin

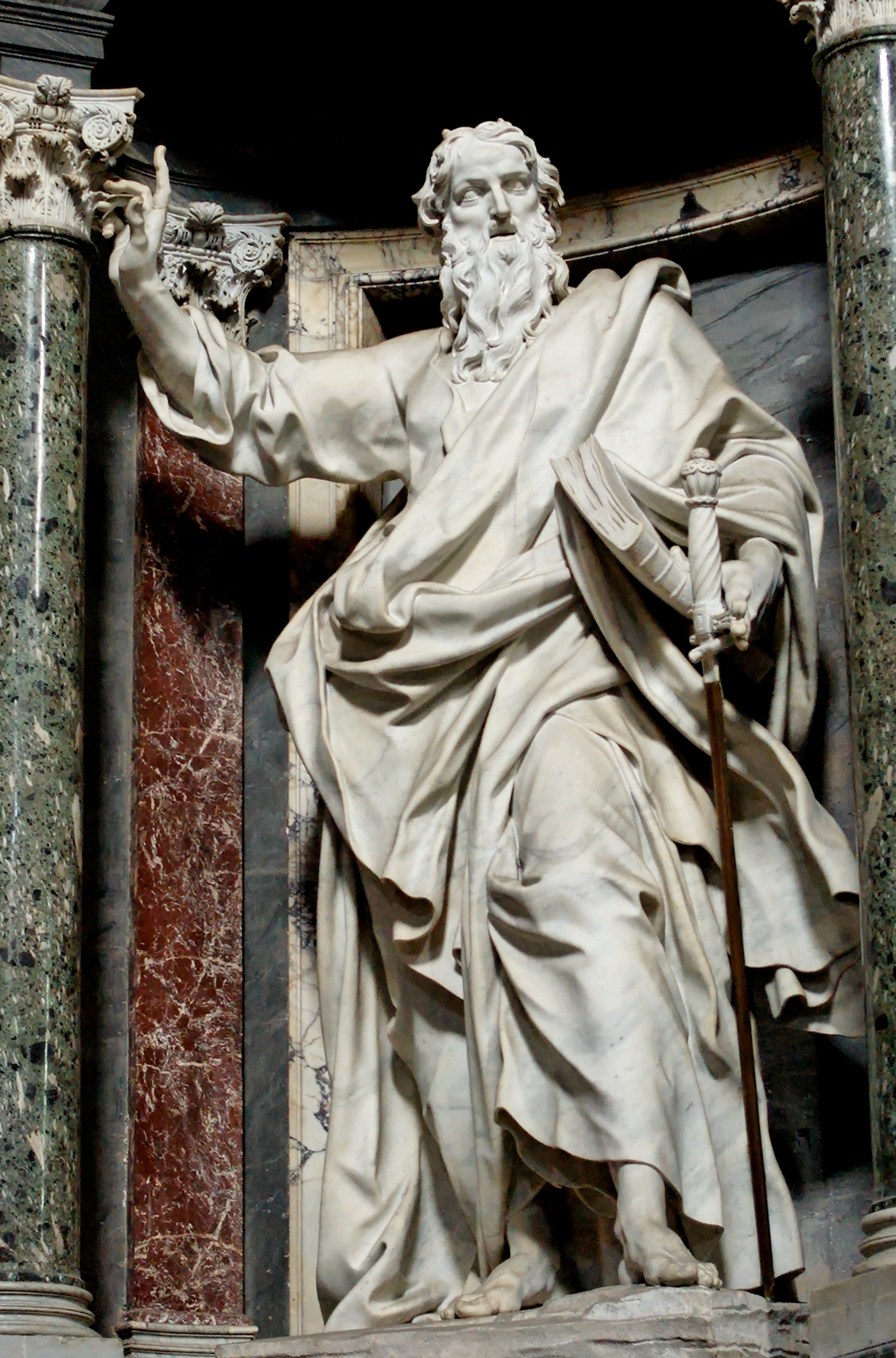
Saint Paul, St. John Lateran

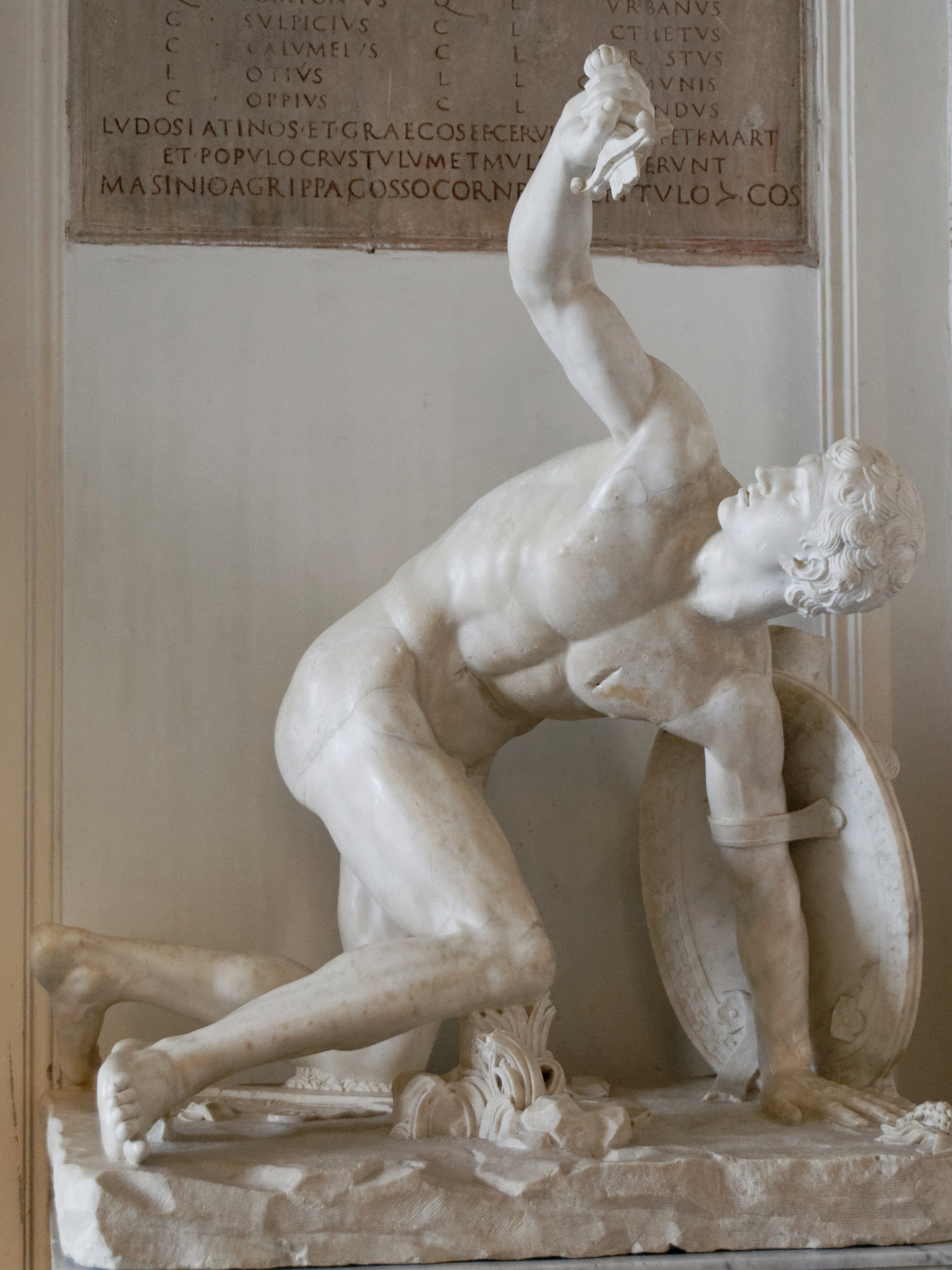
Wounded Warrior based on an antique fragment of a Discobolos, undated, Capitoline Museums

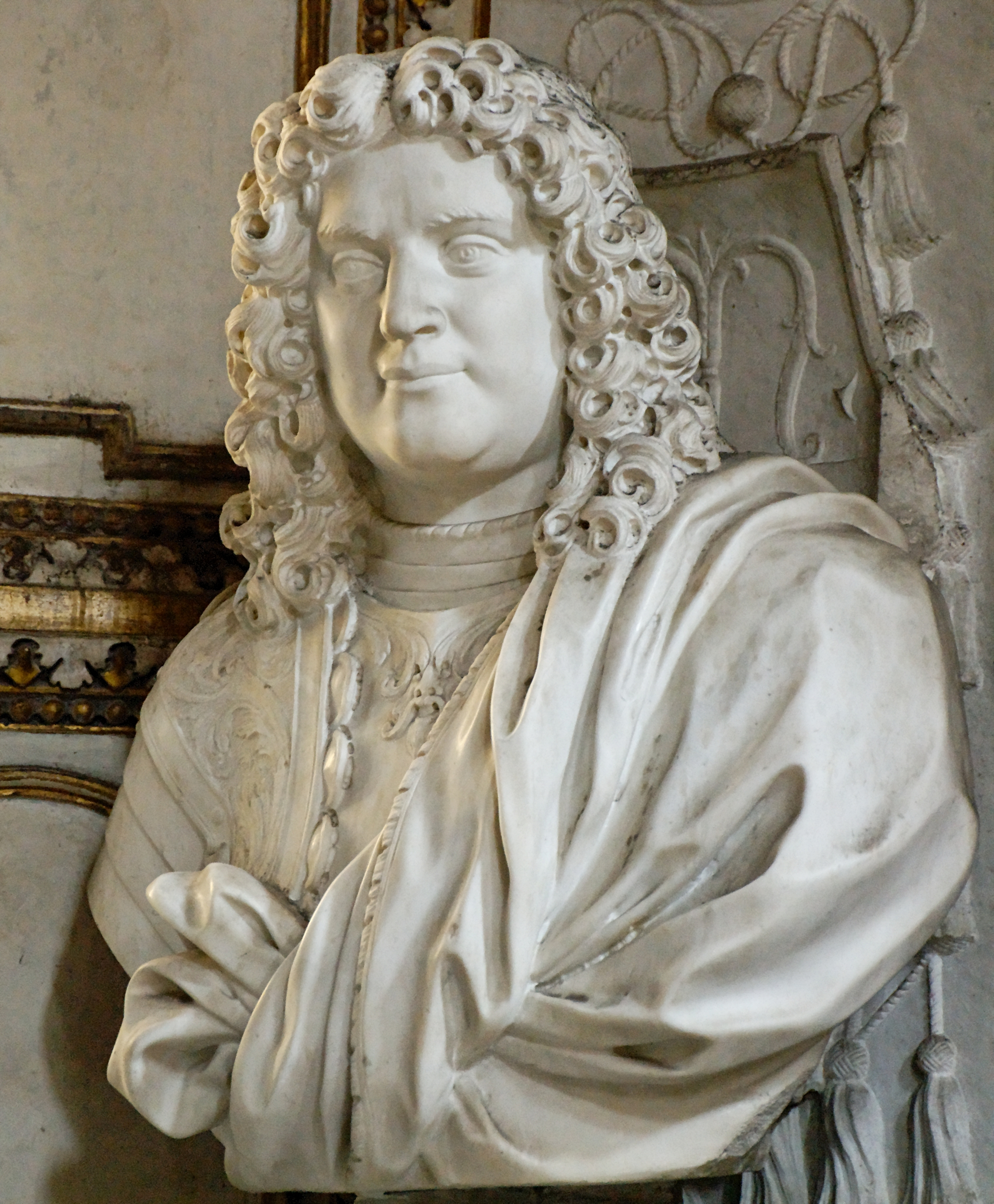
Bust on the monument of Savo Mellini in Santa Maria del Popolo
