= Giovanni Battista Mellini =

Italian Roman Catholic bishop and cardinal

Giovanni Battista Mellini (9 June, 1405 – 24 July, 1478) (called the Cardinal of Urbino) was an Italian Roman Catholic bishop and cardinal.

== Biography ==
Giovanni Battista Mellini was born in Rome on 9 June 1405, the son of a noble family. He received funds from Pope Martin V to study law.

When he was seven years old, Antipope John XXIII made him a canon of the Archbasilica of St. John Lateran. He resigned this canonry during the pontificate of Pope Nicholas V, who made him economous of St. Peter's Basilica. He served as Abbreviatore de parco maggiore under Pope Eugene IV; as corrector of papal letters under Pope Pius II; and as papal datary under Pope Paul II.

On 27 April 1468 he was elected Bishop of Urbino. He subsequently held this see until his death.

In the consistory of 16 December 1476, Pope Sixtus IV made him a cardinal priest. He received the red hat and the titular church of Santi Nereo e Achilleo on 30 December 1476.

On 1 January 1477 the pope named him papal legate in the Duchy of Milan and Lombardy, with full powers to keep following the 26 December 1476 death of Galeazzo Maria Sforza. Cardinal Mellini left for this legation on 27 January 1477 and returned to Rome on 9 May.

He died in Rome on 24 July 1478. He was buried in St Peter's Basilica but his tomb was later transferred to the Mellini family chapel in Santa Maria del Popolo.

Catholic Church titles
Preceded by Girolamo Staccoli	Bishop of Urbino; 1468–1478	Succeeded by Lazarus Racanelli
Preceded by Giovanni Arcimboldo	Cardinal-Priest of Santi Nereo ed Achilleo; 1476–1478	Succeeded by Cosma Orsini
