= Venerini =

Venerini may refer to:

- Rosa Venerini, M.P.V., Saint (1656–1728), Italian foundress of the Religious Teachers Venerini (Italian: Maestre Pie Venerini)
- Religious Teachers Venerini, a pioneering institute of the Catholic Church for free public education of girls in Italy

== See also ==
- Veneri (disambiguation)
