= Carlo Carafa (disambiguation) =

Carlo Carafa (1517–1561) was an Italian cardinal-nephew of Pope Paul IV and papal legate.

Carlo Carafa may also refer to:

- Carlo Carafa (bishop of Aversa) (1584–1644), bishop of Aversa and Apostolic Nuncio to Austria
- Carlo Carafa (bishop of Boiano) (died 1608), bishop of Boiano and of Guardialfiera
- Carlo Carafa della Spina (1611–1680), cardinal-priest of Santa Maria in Via
- Carlo Carafa (1561–1633), presbyter and founder of Congregation of Pious Workers
