= Religious Teachers Venerini =

- Maestre Pie Venerini
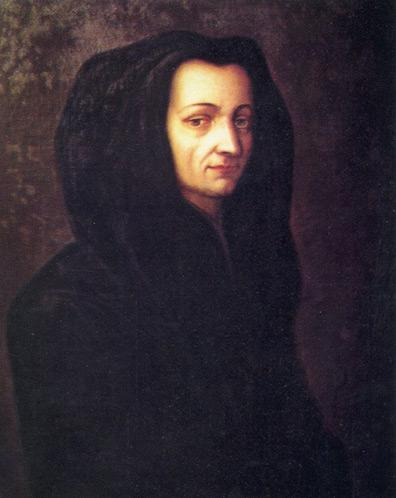
- Saint Rose Venerini; Foundress
- Abbreviation: M.P.V.
- Formation: 1685; 341 years ago
- Founder: Saint Rose Venerini
- Founded at: Italy
- Website: www.maestrepievenerini.it

The Religious Teachers Venerini (abbreviated as M.P.V., Italian: Maestre Pie Venerini) are a religious institute in the Catholic Church founded in Italy by Saint Rose Venerini in 1685. They were the pioneers of free public education for girls in Italy. They are commonly called the Venerini Sisters.

== History ==
=== Founding ===
The foundress of the institute, Rose Venerini, was born in Viterbo, Italy, in 1656, the daughter of a leading physician of the city. She felt a strong desire to serve God from her childhood. She entered briefly a Dominican monastery, but had to leave to care for her mother, after the unexpected death of her father.

Once home, Venerini searched for how she could still fulfill her commitment to God. She invited women and girls of the town to gather in her home to pray the rosary together. Conversations with them showed her the depth of their ignorance of both their Catholic faith and of general knowledge. Under the guidance of a Jesuit spiritual director, she gradually came to see answering the crying need for education as her calling, rather than the cloistered life.

On August 30, 1685, with the approval of the Bishop of Viterbo, Cardinal Urbano Sacchetti, and the collaboration of two friends, Gerolama Coluzzelli and Porzia Bacci, Venerini left her father's home to begin her first school. The primary objective of the school was to give poor girls a complete Christian formation and to prepare them for life in society. Rose opened the first public school for girls in Italy. The origins were humble but the impact was deep, and it did not take long to receive the recognition of the religious and civil authorities. The three teachers had to face the resistance of clergy who considered the teaching of the catechism as their exclusive prerogative. But the harshest suspicion came from those who were scandalized by the boldness of this woman of the upper middle class of Viterbo, who had taken to heart the education of ignorant girls. The same pastors later recognized the moral improvement which education had generated among the girls and their mothers.

=== Expansion ===
After her initial successes, in 1692 Venerini was invited by the Bishop of Montefiascone, Cardinal Marcantonio Barbarigo, to establish schools in that diocese under her vision. She also trained a local successor, the future St. Lucia Filippini, who soon established an independent religious institute of teachers, who came to be known as the Religious Teachers Filippini.

Venerini then returned to Viterbo to supervise the original school. From there, other schools were started throughout the region of Lazio. The Sisters were invited to duplicate their work in Rome in 1706, but the first experience there was a major failure, one which marked her deeply and caused her to wait six long years before regaining the trust of the authorities. On December 8, 1713, with the help of an abbot who was a good friend of the Venerini family, Venerini was able to open one of her schools in the center of Rome at the foot of the Campidoglio.

On October 24, 1716, they received a visit from Pope Clement XI, accompanied by eight cardinals, who wanted to observe their lessons. Amazed and pleased, at the end of the morning he addressed these words to the foundress: “Signora Rosa, you are doing that which we cannot do. We thank you very much because with these schools you will sanctify Rome”. From that time on, governors and cardinals sought for the Sisters to establish schools in their areas.

=== Worldwide service ===
In 1909, the Sisters expanded their work to the United States, their first foreign site, going at the invitation of a pastor in Lawrence, Massachusetts, to help with the influx of Italian immigrants. They arrived there on November 28, 1909, and opened the first day care program in the state. From there, they were invited to serve in other parishes in Massachusetts, Rhode Island and in the Diocese of Albany in New York. They operate Venerini Academy in Worcester, Massachusetts.

The Sisters served in Switzerland from 1971 to 1985. They have also opened schools in India, Brazil, Cameroon, Romania, Albania, Chile, Venezuela and Nigeria.

The motherhouse of the Venerini Province in India is located in Cheruvannur, Kerala. The sister apostolate of education includes among other ministries: schools, catechesis in parishes and villages, and a residential school for the visually handicapped.

== Venerini Associates ==
"The Venerini Sisters believe that as women of prayer, we are called to . This ideal of sharing the Gospel message of love, peace, and justice through the charism of Saint Rose Venerini is shared by community members and by persons who, through the Associate Membership, are deeply concerned with the values and goals of Christian living. Inspired by the charism of Saint Rose Venerini, an associate lives the Gospel message through service to the People of God. United in Spirit and prayer with the Sisters, an associate aims to deepen a personal relationship with God. Sharing the vision of the Venerini Sisters, an associate broadens the mission of the vowed members. This association is for interested persons, 18 years of age and older, who wish to give expression to their relationship with the religious community of the Venerini Sisters. The primary bond is one of mutual support through prayer and shared ministries. The Associates make yearly promises and live in their own homes."
