= Agostino Maria De Carlo =

Italian Catholic priest, philosopher and politician (1807–1877)

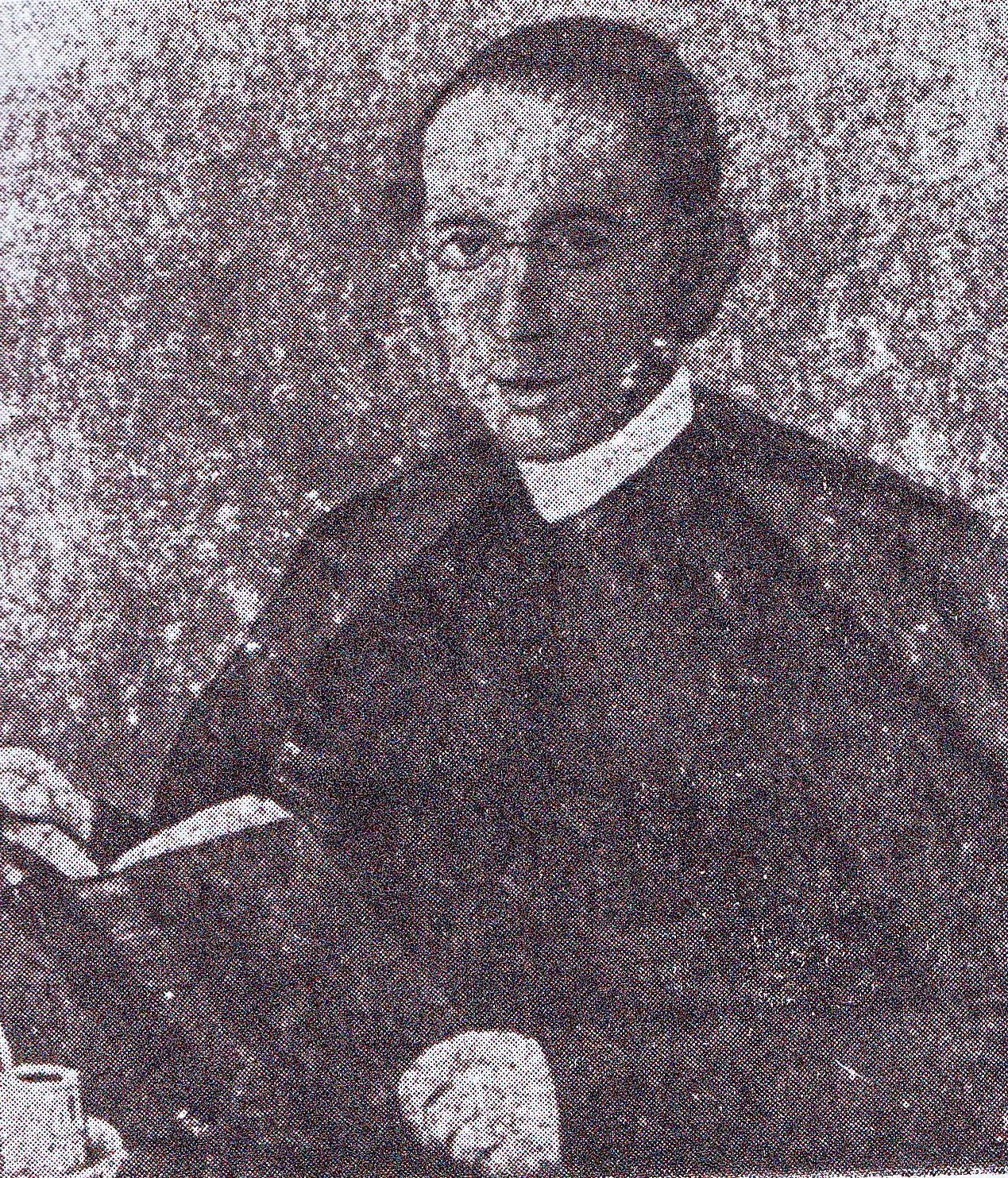
Portrait

Agostino Maria De Carlo (13 September 1807 – 29 January 1877) was an Italian theologian, philosopher and politician.

== Biography ==
Born in Giugliano in Campania (Metropolitan City of Naples) in 1807 to the notary Nicola De Carlo and Maria Taglialatela, he began his studies at the age of eleven at the Diocesan Seminary of Aversa. He continued his education in Naples within the Congregation of Pious Workers, a religious institute in which his brother Ettore served as Superior General. After obtaining a degree in dogmatic theology, he was ordained a priest in 1829.

He subsequently enrolled at the University of Naples Federico II, where he graduated in philosophy with a specialization in the thought of Plato. At the same university he pursued an academic career, becoming a lecturer and eventually obtaining the chair of theoretical philosophy.

De Carlo was also active in the public and administrative life of his hometown. In 1861 he was elected to the Provincial Council for the Giugliano constituency and also served as a municipal councillor. Drawing on this administrative experience, he wrote the essay Consigliere non Consigliere, a work focused on the ethical and institutional duties of local political representatives.

In the field of public welfare and education, he founded and financed the first kindergarten in the Giugliano area. In the same town he established and directed a grammar school, while also promoting the creation of male and female youth congregations.

As a theologian, De Carlo distinguished himself particularly in the field of Mariology. In his writings he anticipated the doctrinal reflections that would lead to the proclamation of the dogma of the Immaculate Conception, officially defined by Pope Pius IX on 8 December 1854.

He died in Giugliano on 29 January 1877 and was buried in the Chapel of the Nobles in the local cemetery.

== Publications ==
- Theotocologia seu institutio de Virgine Dei Genitrice Maria scholastica methodo IV libris concinnata, 2 vols., Naples, Cirillo Press, 1845.
- Istituzione Filosofica secondo i Princìpj di Giambattista Vico ad uso della gioventù studiosa ("Philosophical Institution according to the Principles of Giambattista Vico for the Use of Students"), Naples, Cirillo Press, 1855.
- Dialoghi istruttivi sui pregi, misteri e titoli di Maria Santissima ("Instructive Dialogues on the Virtues, Mysteries and Titles of the Blessed Virgin Mary"), published posthumously and edited by S. Basile and Canon Monforte (Ricciardi, Naples, 1903); a distinctly devotional work intended to promote devotion to the Virgin Mary among young people.
- Consigliere non Consigliere ("Councillor and Non-Councillor").

== Honours ==
In 1983, a local secondary school was named after him in recognition of his contributions to the development of public education.

== Bibliography ==
- Riccitiello, Francesco (1983). Giugliano in Campania - Radici storiche di cultura e civiltà. Giugliano in Campania: Ed. Centro Studi A. Taglialatela. p. 114.
- Various authors (1988). Una Guida per Giugliano (2nd ed.). Giugliano in Campania: Centro Studi Alberto Taglialatela. p. 123.
- Di Landa, A. (1992). "Agostino Maria De Carlo (1807–1877), mariologo aversano". Studi storici e religiosi. 1: 185–194.
- De Fiores, Stefano (2005). Testi mariani del secondo millennio (2nd ed.). Rome: Città Nuova. p. 657. ISBN 9788831192873.
