= Cupola =

Architectural structure on top of a building

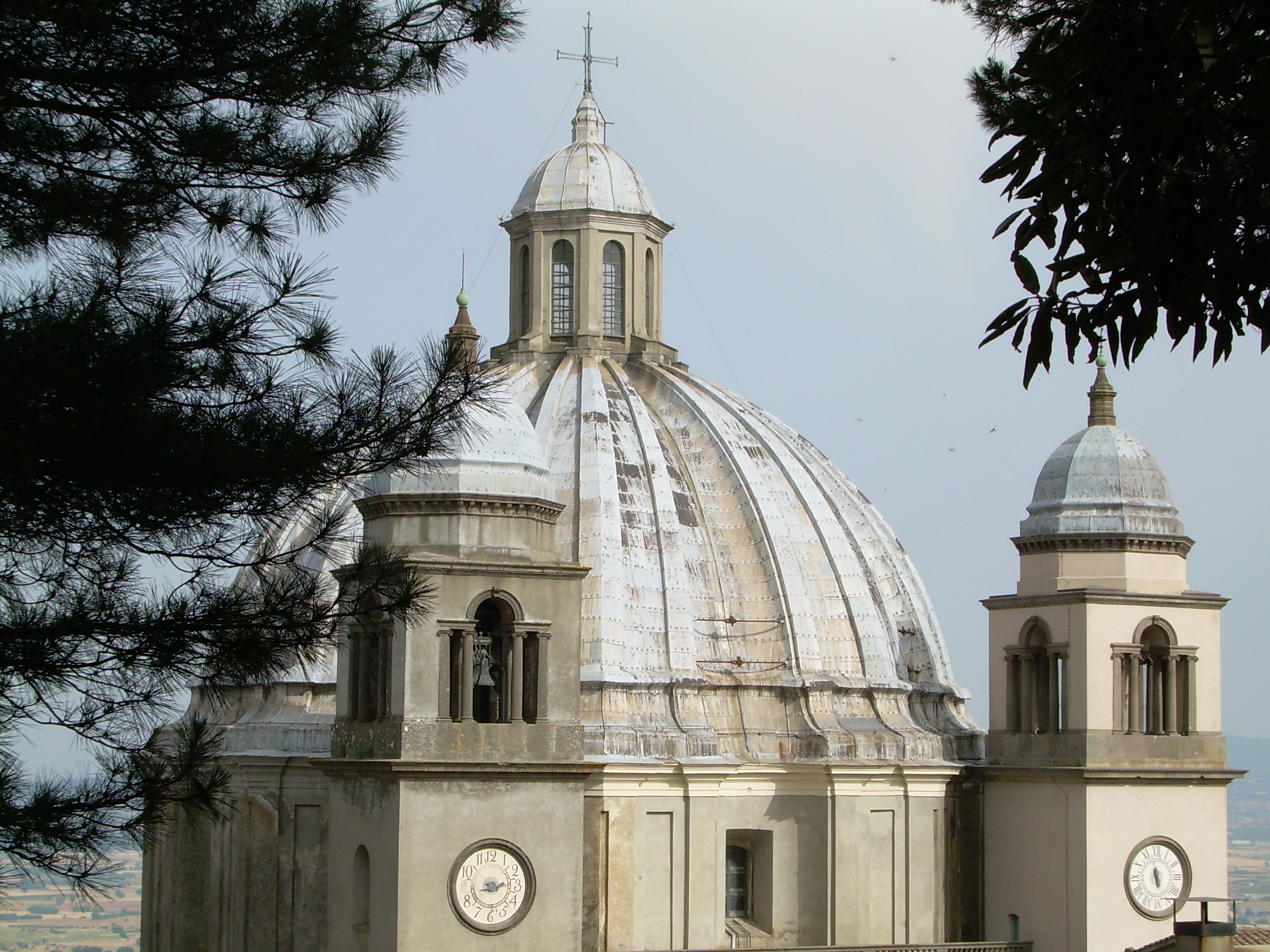
Cupolas on the towers of Montefiascone Cathedral, Italy

In architecture, a cupola (/ˈk(j)uːpələ/ KOO-pə-lə, KEW-) is a relatively small, usually dome-like structure on top of a building often crowning a larger roof or dome. Cupolas often serve as a roof lantern to admit light and air or as a lookout.

The word derives, via Italian, from lower Latin cupula (classical Latin cupella), from Ancient Greek κύπελλον (kúpellon) 'small cup' (Latin cupa), indicating a vault resembling an upside-down cup. (Note: In Italian, cupola simply means "dome", and the ornamental top element, allowing light to enter, is called a lantern (Italian: lanterna).)

The cylindrical drum underneath a larger cupola is called a tholobate.

== Background ==
The cupola evolved during the Renaissance from the older oculus.

Cupolas often serve as a belfry, belvedere, or roof lantern above a main roof. In other cases they may crown a spire, tower, or turret. Barns often have cupolas for ventilation.

Cupolas can also appear as small buildings in their own right.

The square, dome-like segment of a North American railroad train caboose that contains the second-level or "angel" seats is also called a cupola.

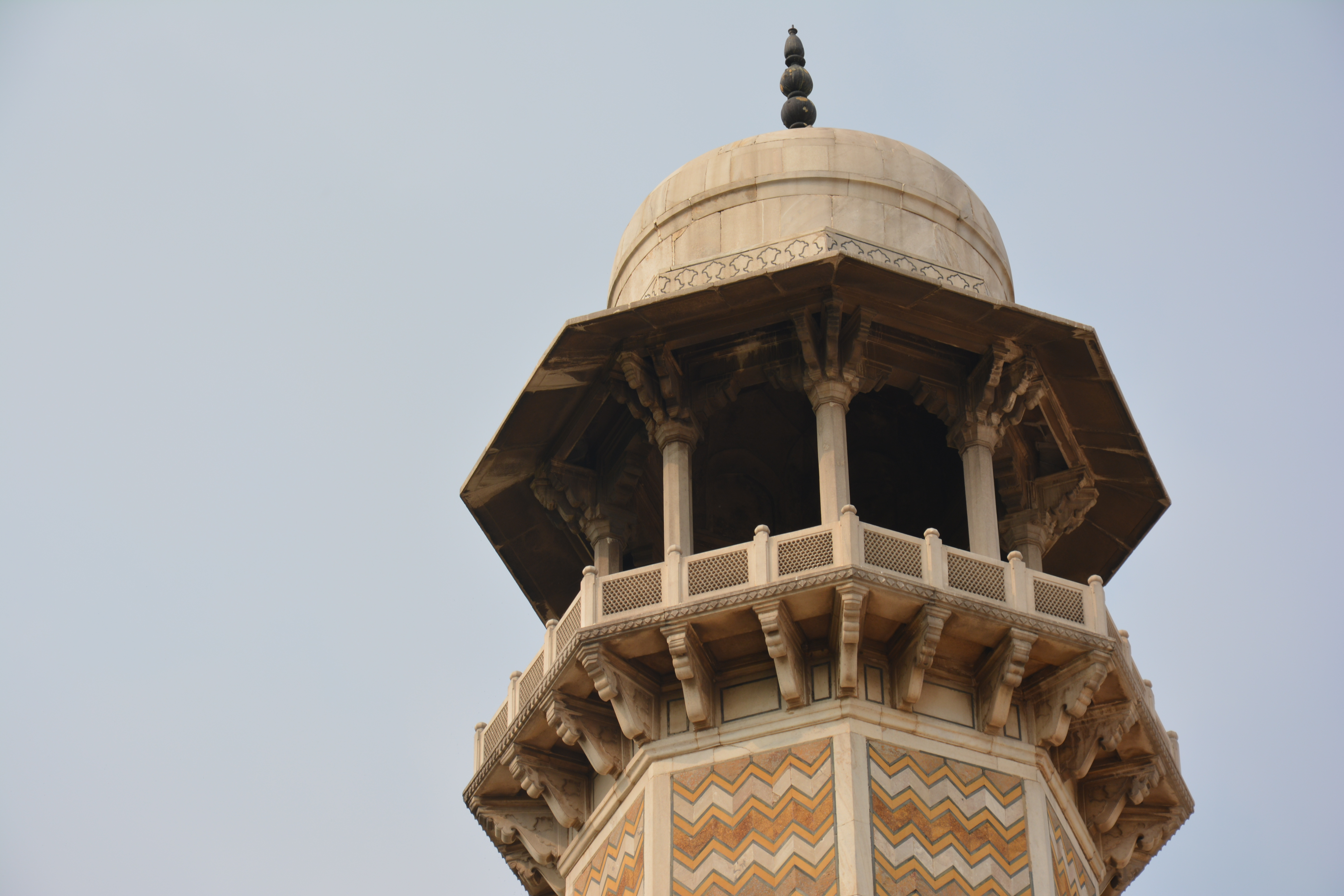
White marble cupolas cap minarets at the Tomb of Jahangir in Lahore, Pakistan

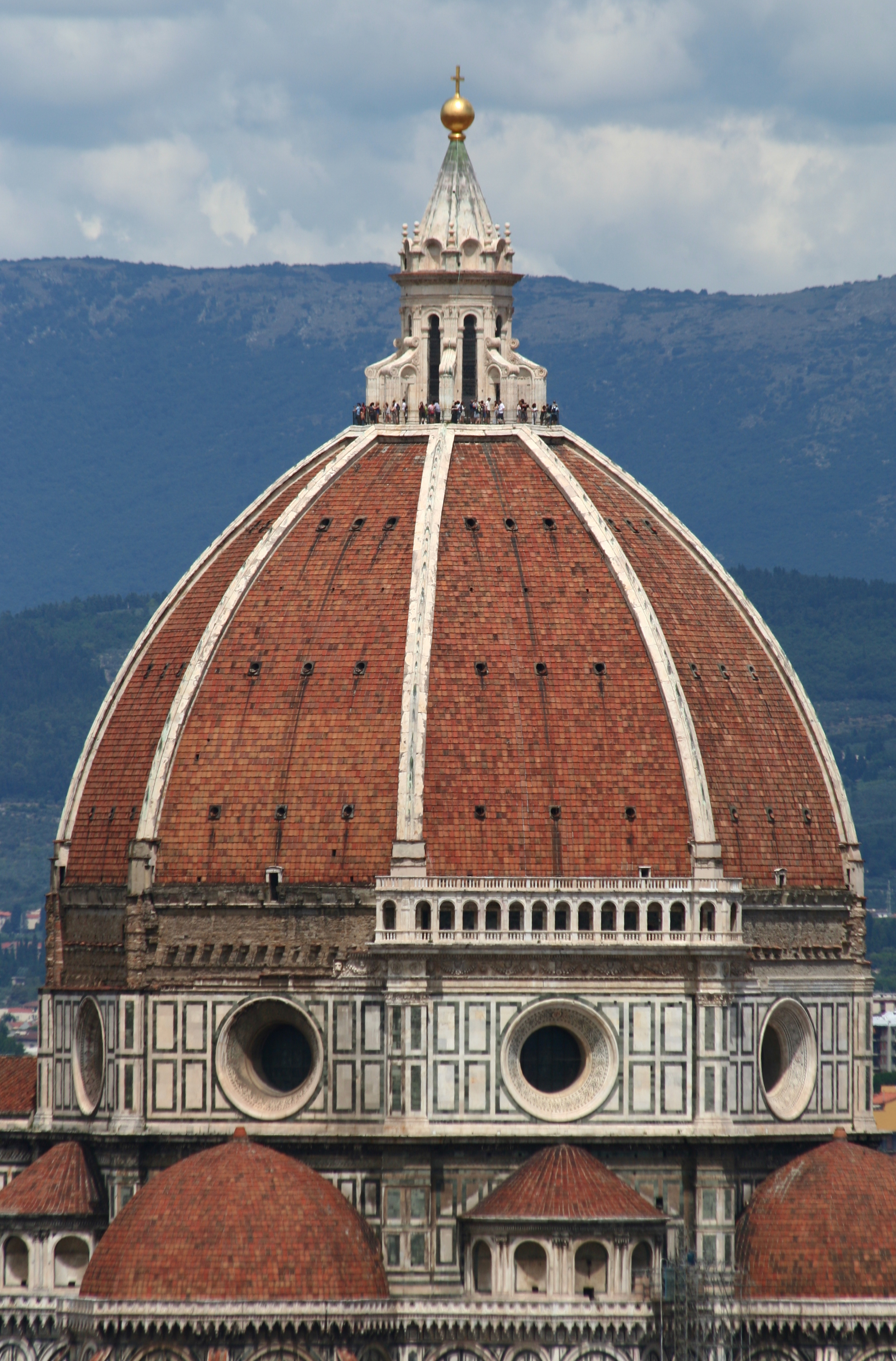
The dome of Florence Cathedral with a roof lantern at the top

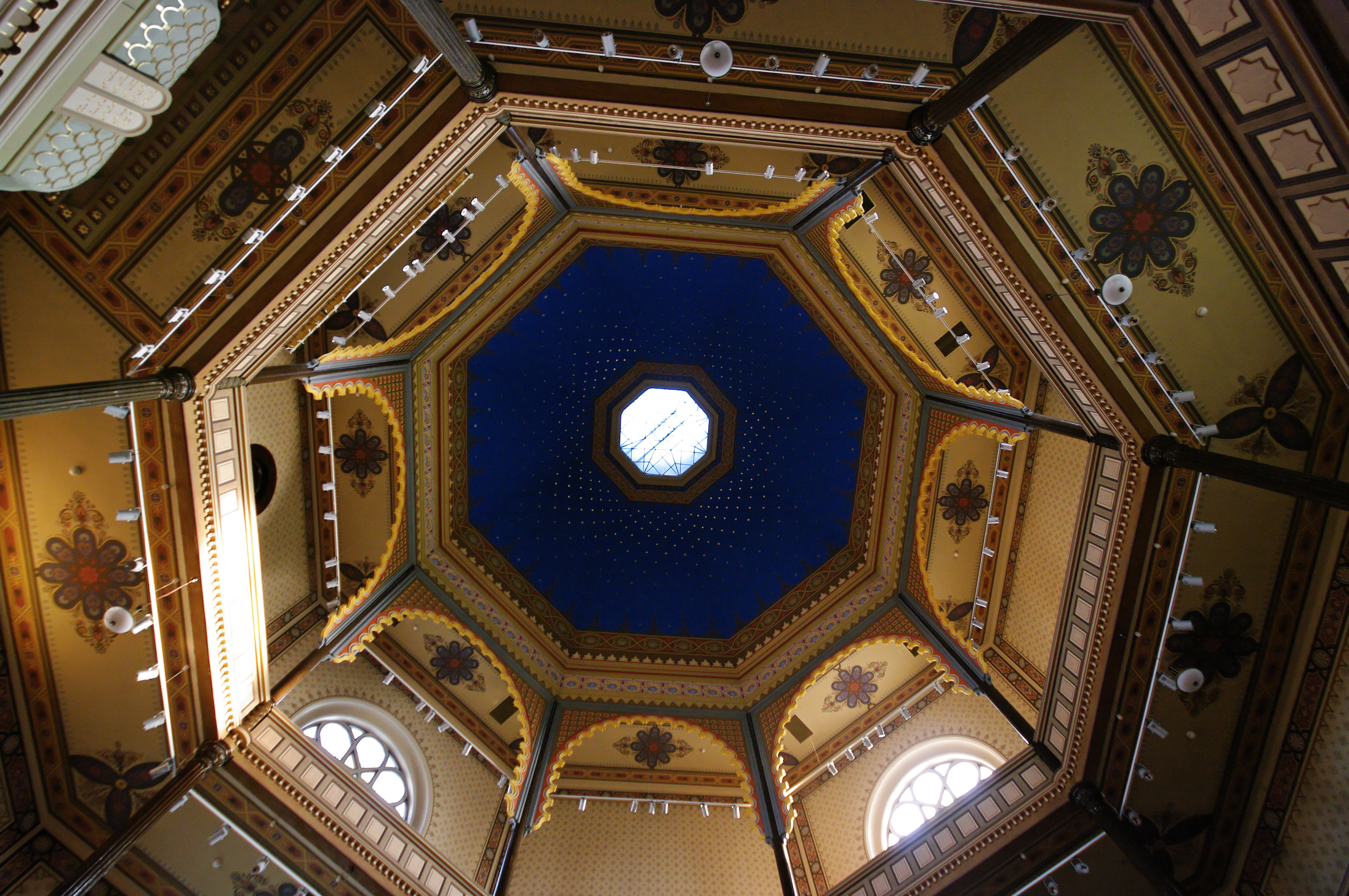
Interior of cupola ceiling in the old Synagogue of Győr, Hungary.

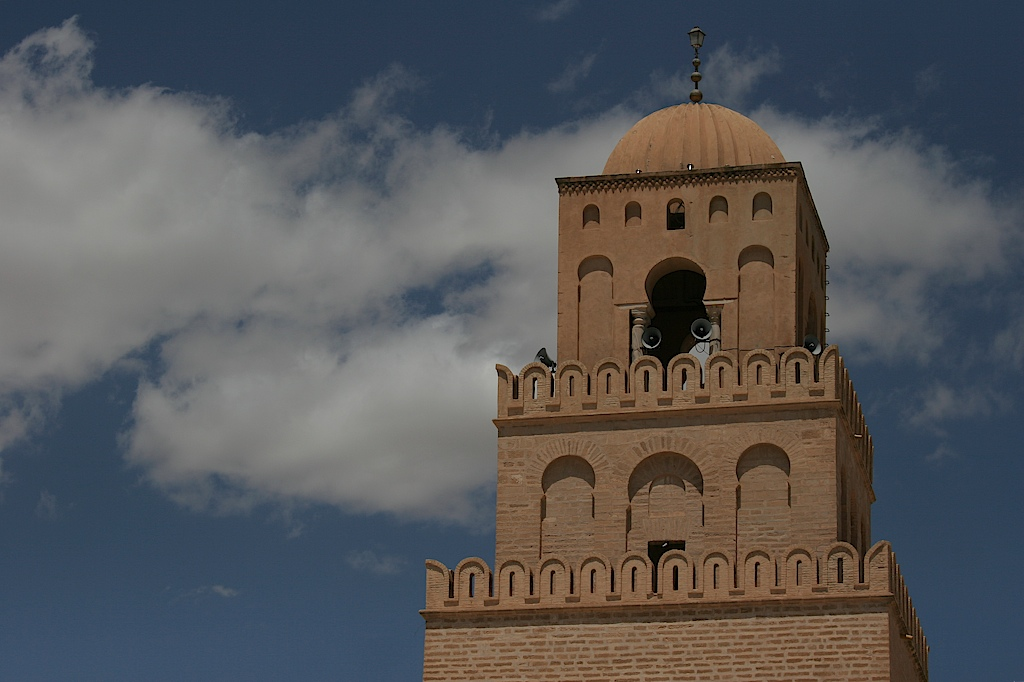
Ribbed cupola crowns the minaret of the Great Mosque of Kairouan, in Kairouan, Tunisia.

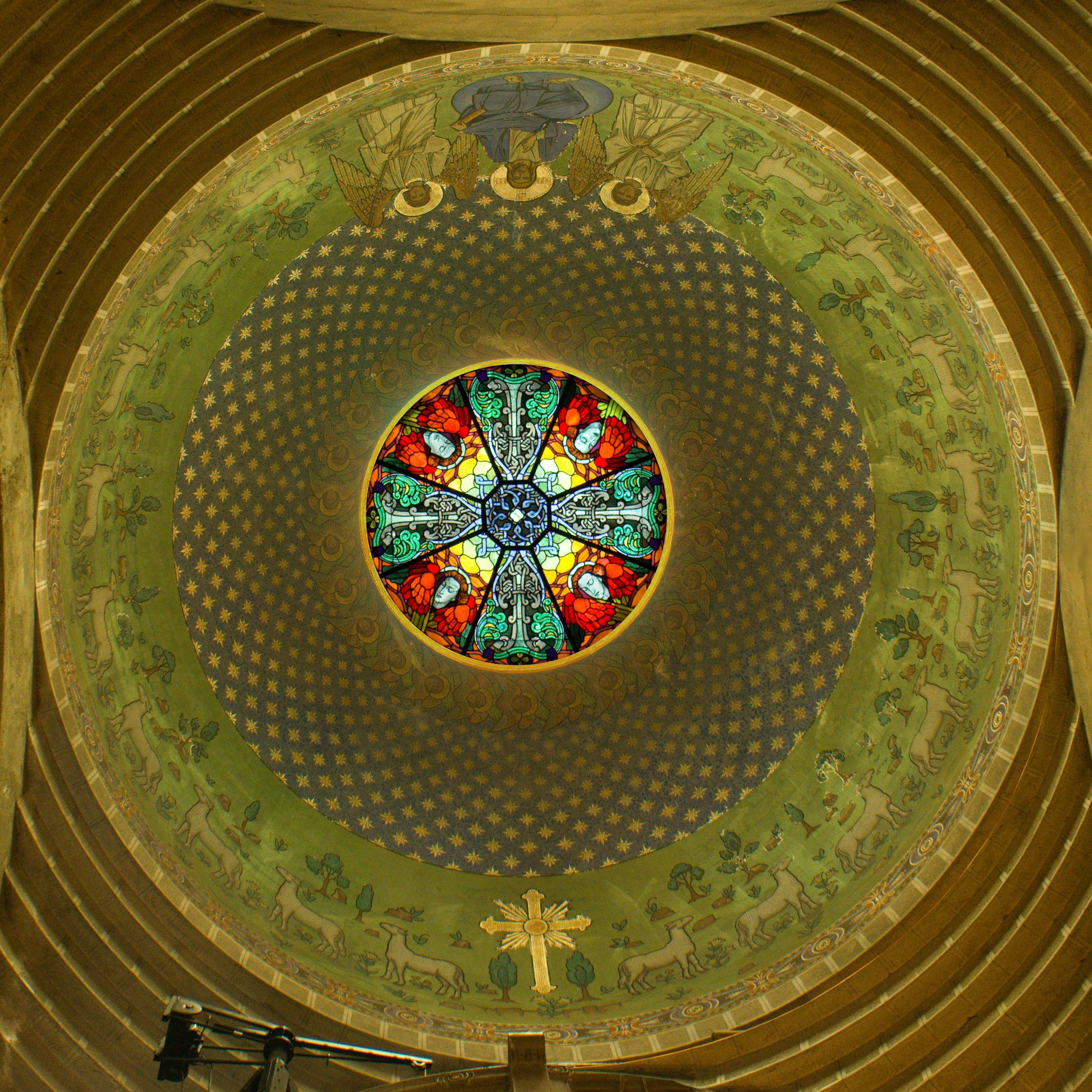
Inside of Armenian Orthodox church cupola in Lviv, Ukraine.

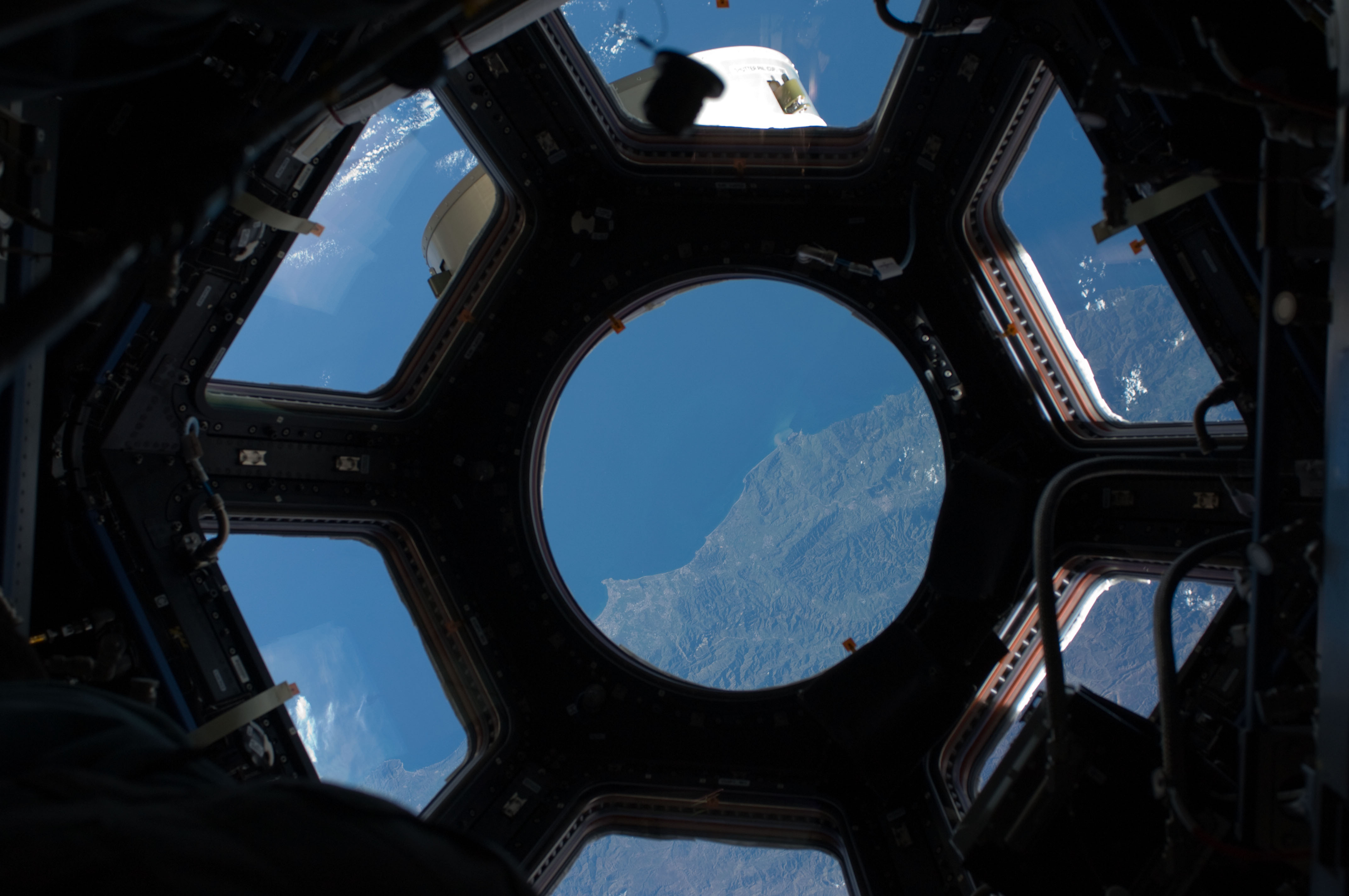
View from the interior of the Cupola module on the International Space Station.

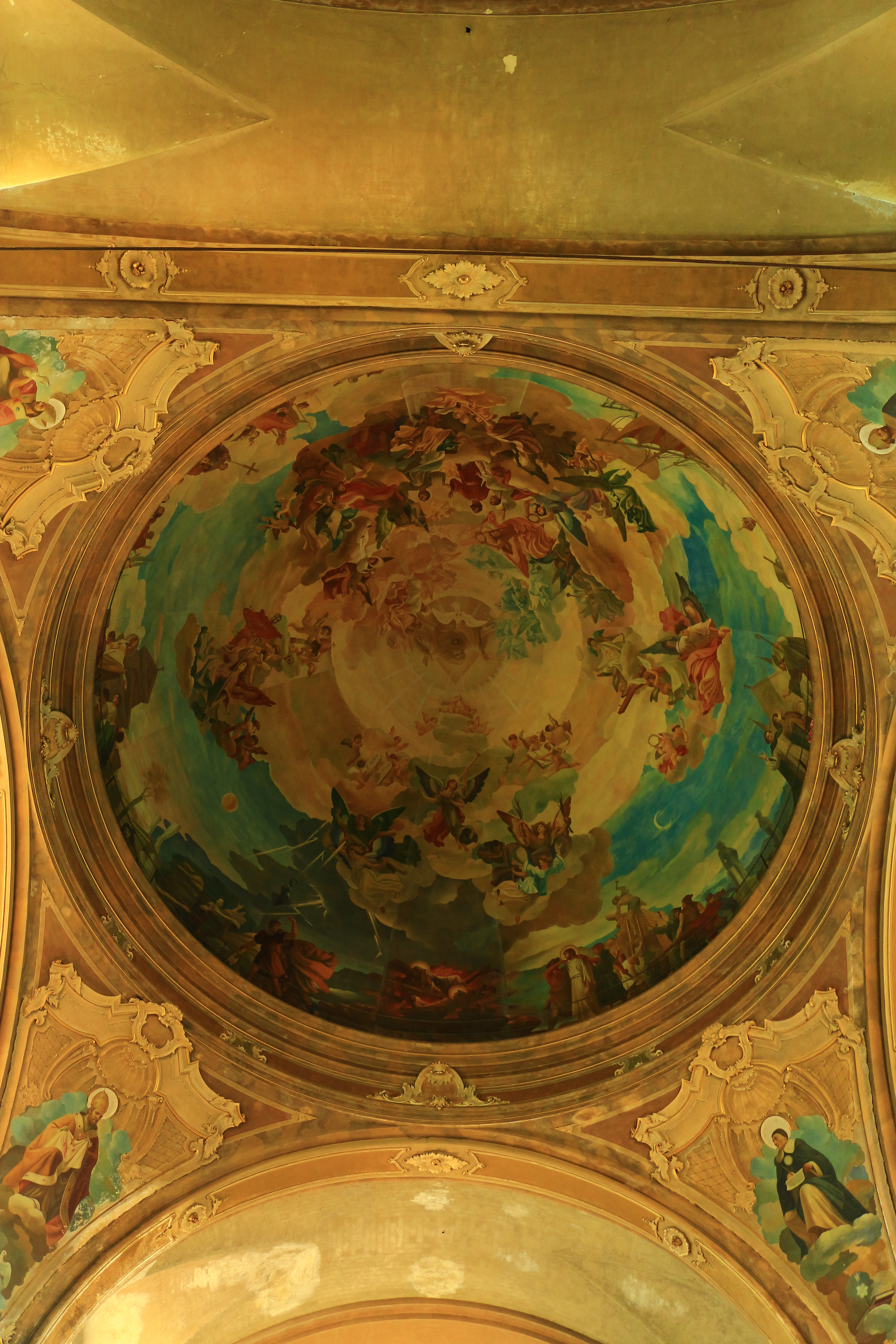
Trompe-l'œil painting of a cupola in a church in Northern Italy (Brivio)

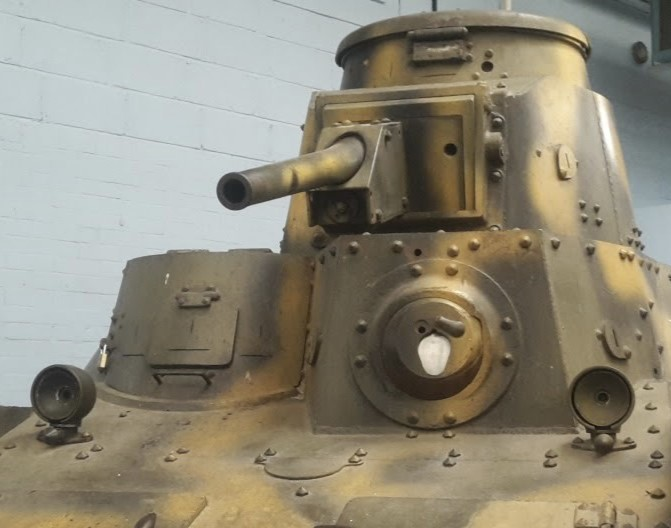
The turret of a Japanese Type 91 Ha-Go light tank with its distinctive, bubble-shaped commander's cupola

== On armoured vehicles ==
The term cupola can also refer to the protrusions atop an armoured fighting vehicle due to their distinctive dome-like appearance. They allow crew or personnel to observe, offering very good all round vision, or even field weaponry, without being exposed to incoming fire. Later designs, however, became progressively flatter and less prominent as technology evolved to allow designers to reduce the profile of their vehicles.

== See also ==
- Astrodome (aeronautics)
- Cupola (ISS module)
- Daylighting
- Windcatcher
