= Veneri =

Veneri may refer to:

- Giacomo Veneri de Racaneto (died 1460), Roman Catholic Archbishop of Dubrovnik
- Veneri al sole, a 1965 Italian comedy film directed by Marino Girolami
- Giacomo Veneri (Siena, 1973), Italian author of several books

== See also ==
- Venerini (disambiguation)
