= Congregation of Pious Workers Rural Catechists =

Roman Catholic religious order

The Congregation of Pious Workers Rural Catechists or Ardorini Missionaries (in Latin Congregatio Piorum Operariorum Catechistarum Ruralium) are a Roman Catholic religious order. They use the post-nominal initials P.O.C.R.

The congregation was founded in 1943 through a merger of two orders; this was the union of the Congregation of Pious Workers (founded by Carlo Carafa in Naples in 1600 using the post-nominal initials C.P.O.) with the Congregation of Rural Catechists (founded by Gaetano Mauro in Montalto Uffugo in 1928).

In 2022, Father Salvatore Cimino was named as Superior General of the Ardorini Missionaries.

== History ==
=== Congregation of Pious Workers ===
The congregation, originally known as "the Christian doctrine", was founded near Naples around 1600 by Carlo Carafa (1561-1633) for the service of the poor and the teaching of catechism in rural areas. The institute received pontifical recognition in 1606. In 1617 the Church of San Giorgio Maggiore in Naples was offered to the fathers as its headquarters. The congregation was approved on 1 April 1621 by Pope Gregory XV, who changed its title to "Pious Workers" (the religious, in addition to catechesis, dedicated themselves to works of charity and had added to their purposes the preaching of the popular missions in the countryside).

The Pious Workers risked extinction during the plague epidemic of 1656, during which they worked hard to assist the infected and many caught the disease in turn; the congregation revived thanks to Pietro Gisolfo. In 1687 they had a seat in Rome, first at the Church of Santa Balbina, then at the parish of San Lorenzo ai Monti, and in 1732 in San Giuseppe alla Lungara.

Although their apostolate was limited to the areas surrounding Rome and Naples and their number was limited (the institute almost never exceeded one hundred members), the Pious Workers had great prestige in the seventeenth and eighteenth centuries and their houses (especially St. Nicholas of Charity in Naples) were renowned centers of spirituality. With the constitution Inter Multiplices of December 14, 1792, Pope Pius VI extended to the Pious Workers all the privileges of the regular orders.

The Pious Workers exercised a considerable influence on the nascent congregations of the Pious Teachers of Lucia Filippini and the Redemptorists (the Pious Workers were the bishops Emilio Giacomo Cavalieri, maternal uncle of Alfonso Maria de' Liguori, and Tommaso Falcoia, who contributed to the birth of the Redemptorist nuns). Alphonsus appears to have held the memory of Father Caraffa in great esteem, and appears to have copied the institute of the Pious Workers in several points when preparing the rules of his own congregation.

With the Napoleonic suppressions and the Savoy subversive laws, the congregation saw a considerable reduction in the number of its members, so much so that in 1943 only one Pio Operaio, Pasquale Ossorio, residing in San Nicola alla Carità, remained alive.

=== Congregation of Rural Catechists ===
In 1925 Gaetano Mauro (1888-1969) founded in Calabria the Religious Association of Rural Orators (A.R.D.O.R.), a company of priests and lay people for the teaching of catechism to farmers and to those who lived in remote areas. Some members of the association (called "ardorini") in 1928 began to lead a common life at the convent of San Francesco di Paola in Montalto Uffugo.

On December 8, 1928 the ardorini of common life were constituted into a religious congregation, taking the name of "Rural Catechists", and on June 27, 1930 the institute obtained the approval of the Archbishop of Cosenza.

=== Union of the two congregations ===
To prevent the old congregation of the Pious Workers from becoming extinct, by decree of 28 June 1943 the Holy See united the Rural Catechists, who had the same aims; the Roman community of Rural Catechists moved to the church of San Giuseppe alla Lungara, while some Calabrian religious settled, together with the last Worker Pius, at the church of San Nicola della Carità.

With the decree of union the Holy See appointed superior general of the new congregation Pasquale Ossorio; the ancient constitutions of the Pious Workers were abolished and replaced with those elaborated by Mauro in 1931. Mauro died on the last day of 1969; in 2023, Pope Francis advanced his cause for sainthood.

== Activity ==
The Ardorini Missionaries are dedicated to the social and religious assistance of rural populations and youth. They are present in Italy, Canada, Colombia, India and Tanzania. The headquarters is in Montalto Uffugo (Cosenza).

As of December 31, 2023, the congregation had 8 houses in different nations as mentioned above.

== Bibliography ==
- Annuario Pontificio per l'anno 2010, Libreria Editrice Vaticana, Città del Vaticano 2010. ISBN 978-88-209-8355-0.
- Guerrino Pelliccia e Giancarlo Rocca (curr.), Dizionario degli Istituti di Perfezione (10 voll.), Edizioni paoline, Milan, 1974–2003.
