= Rose Venerini =

Italian Roman Catholic saint

Saint Rose Venerini MPV
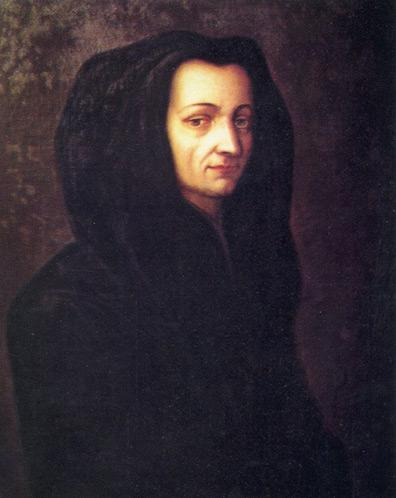

Virgin
- Born: 9 February 1656; Viterbo
- Died: 7 May 1728 (aged 72); Rome
- Venerated in: Roman Catholic Church
- Beatified: 4 May 1952 by Pope Pius XII
- Canonized: 15 October 2006 by Pope Benedict XVI
- Major shrine: Maestre Pie Venerini, Via Giuseppe Gioachino Belli 31, 00193 Rome, Italy
- Feast: 7 May
- Attributes: Venerini Sisters, Children or young women, A book or scroll, The Rosary
- Patronage: Catholic teachers and educators

Rose Venerini (9 February 1656 – 7 May 1728), also called Rosa Venerini, was an Italian Roman Catholic saint and virgin who founded the first public schools for girls and young women in Italy. According to the Vatican document published on the occasion of Venerini's canonization in 2006, "Wherever a new school sprang up, in a short time a moral improvement could be noted in the youth". Her confraternity of teachers, after her death, was raised to a religious congregation called the Religious Teachers Venerini (or Venerini sisters), which worked with Italian immigrants in the U.S. and Switzerland established the first day care centers in the Northeastern U.S., and worked throughout the world. Her feast day is May 7.

== Early life ==
Rose Venerini was born on February 9, 1659, in Viterbo, Italy, to her father, Goffredo, a famous and accomplished doctor who was originally from Castellone di Suasa, in the Marche region of Italy, and her mother, Marzia Zampichetti, who was "of an ancient family of Viterbo". She had four siblings, Dominico, Maria Maddalena, Rosa, and Orazio.

At the age of 7, Venerini made a vow to consecrate her life to God. At the age of 20, in the fall of 1676, on the advice of her father and after the death of her fiancé, she entered the Dominican Monastery of St. Catherine, where her aunt, Anna Cecilia, was also a nun and where she learned meditation and silent prayer. She left a few months later because she had to return home to care for her mother after her father's death. Her brother Domenico died at the age of 27; her mother also died two months later. Her sister, Maria Maddalena, married and left home; then another brother, Orazio, died, leaving only her and her last surviving brother, Orazio, at home.

In May 1684, when she was 24 years old, Venerini began to gather the girls and women in her neighborhood in her home to pray the rosary. She learned that "the woman of the common people was a slave of cultural, moral and spiritual poverty", and began to see that her calling was the Christian formation and education of young women. She became dismayed by the deficiencies she saw in their education and religious formation, which pointed her toward her "ultimate vocation in the field of teaching".

== Career ==
On August 30, 1685, with the guidance of her spiritual director and approval of her bishop, and with the assistance of her friends Gerolama Coluzzelli and Porzia Bacci, Venerini left her father's home and founded her first school in Viterbo for poor girls and young women, the first public school for girls in Italy. As Alban Butler put it, Venerini "chose to be a teacher in the world rather than a contemplative in a convent". The objective of her school was "to give poor girls a complete Christian formation and to prepare them for life in society". It was quickly recognized by the civil and religious authorities, and she was recognized as a "born teacher". The teachers of Venerini's school faced public scrutiny because she was a woman and because her educational methods were unconventional, and at first, faced resistance from the clergy, who considered the teaching of the catechism their purview. As Butler states, "In these tasks she was undeterred by opposition, which sometimes resulted in arson and physical attacks on the teachers". Eventually, the clergy recognized that Venerini's school had a positive impact on the community and her fame spread outside of Viterbo. According to the Vatican document published on the occasion of Venerini's canonization, "Wherever a new school sprang up, in a short time a moral improvement could be noted in the youth".

Venerini, on the invitation of Cardinal Giovanni Barbarigo, the nephew of Saint Gregorio Barbarigo, founded ten schools in Montefiascone and the villages surrounding Lake Bolsena between 1692 and 1694, and other schools were founded in Lazio. Barbarigo did the fundraising and Venerini publicized the schools to families, trained the teachers, and organized the schools. It was during this time when Venerini befriended and became the confidante of Saint Lucy Filippini, who she placed as head of the schools and who later organized the diocese's teachers into a separate religious congregation called the Religious Teachers Filippini. Venerini tried to found a school in Rome, but failed. It took her six years, but she finally co-founded a school in central Rome, near the Capitoline Hill, on December 8, 1713. Pope Clement XI, accompanied by eight cardinals, visited the Roman school and observed their classes and instruction, on October 24, 1716, and approved their work. Because of the pope's support, Venerini founded more schools throughout Italy. Pope Clement told them, "Signora Rosa, you are doing that which we cannot do. We thank you very much, because with these schools you will sanctify Rome". She eventually opened over 40 schools.

== Death and legacy ==
Dedicated to the education of girls and young women and to the "passion for God and passion for the salvation of souls", Venerini followed the spirituality of Saint Ignatius of Loyola and combined "an active apostolate with a life of contemplative prayer". She also received the Holy Communion daily. As the Vatican states, "She knew that the proclamation of the Good News could be received if people were first liberated from the darkness of ignorance and error. Moreover, she intuited that professional training could give woman a human promotion and affirmation in society ... Rosa, without pretense and well before its time in history, offered to the Church the model of the Apostolic Religious Community". The document also quotes Venerini: "I feel so nailed to the Will of God that nothing else matters, neither death nor life. I want what He wants; I want to serve Him as much as pleases Him and no more".

Venerini died in Rome on May 7, 1728, when a cult began after miracles were claimed in her name. Her remains were interned in the Church of the Gesù and transferred to the General Motherhouse in Rome when she was beatified in 1952. She was canonized by Pope Benedict XVI on October 15, 2006. Her confraternity was raised to a religious congregation called the Religious Teachers Venerini (or Venerini sisters), which began working with Italian immigrants in the U.S. in 1909 and in Switzerland from 1971 to 1985. They established the first day care centers throughout the Northeastern U.S. The Venerini sisters also worked in India, Brazil, Cameroon, Romania, Albania, Chile, Venezuela and Nigeria. Her feast day is May 7.

== Works cited ==
- Butler, Alban (1997). Butler's Lives of the Saints. Vol. 5 (2 ed.). Collegeville, Minnesota: A&C Black. ISBN 0860122549.
