= Montefiascone Cathedral =

Former cathedral in Montefiascone, Viterbo, Italy

Coordinates: 42.5366°N 12.0303°E

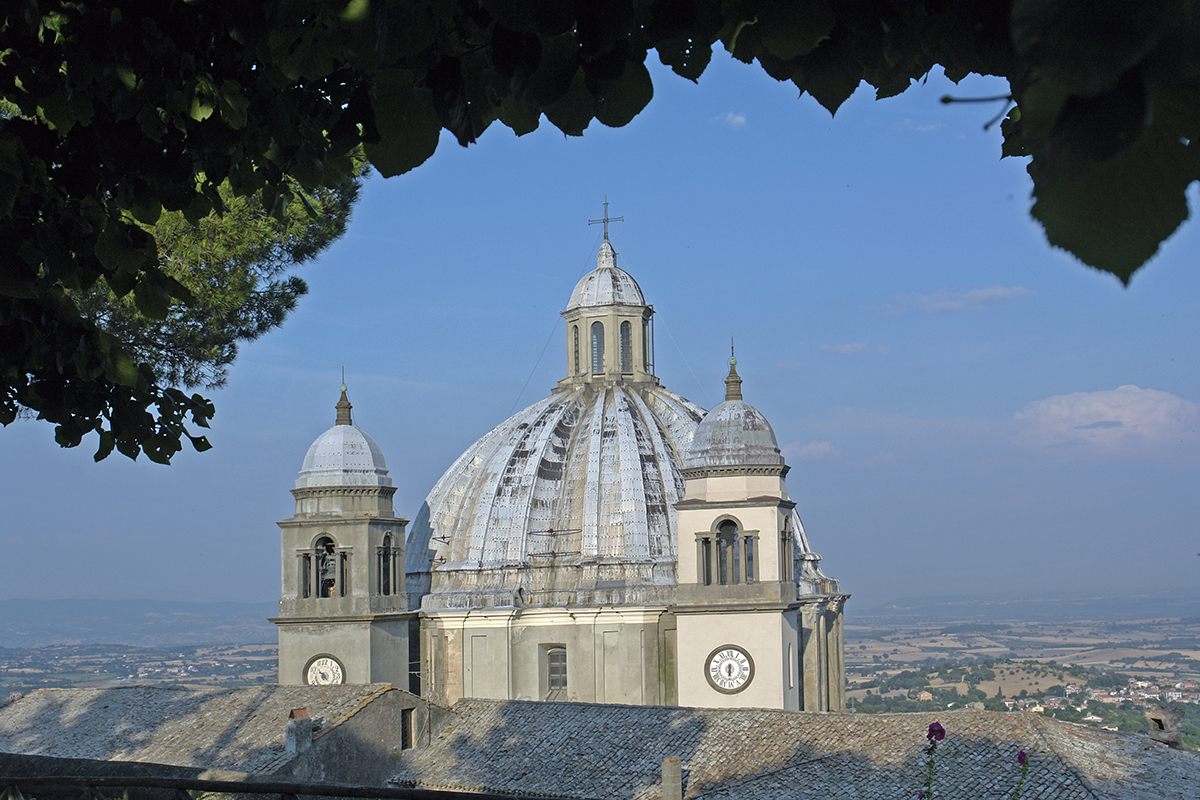
- Montefiascone Cathedral
- Location: Montefiascone, Viterbo
- Country: Italy
- Denomination: Roman Catholic

History
- Status: Basilica minor (since 1943)

Architecture
- Architectural type: Cathedral
- Style: Renaissance
- Completed: c. 15th – c. 16th centuries

Montefiascone Cathedral or the Basilica of Santa Margherita (Italian: Duomo di Montefiascone; Basilica Cattedrale di Santa Margherita) is a former Roman Catholic cathedral in Montefiascone in the province of Viterbo, Italy, dedicated to Saint Margaret of Antioch, the patron saint of the town. It was formerly the episcopal seat of the Diocese of Montefiascone (suppressed and incorporated into the Diocese of Viterbo in 1986) and is now a basilica minor (status bestowed in 1943).

It is one of the most important churches in the area, and has one of the largest domes in Italy (27 m of diameter), which is visible from most of the towns of the Viterbo area.

== History ==
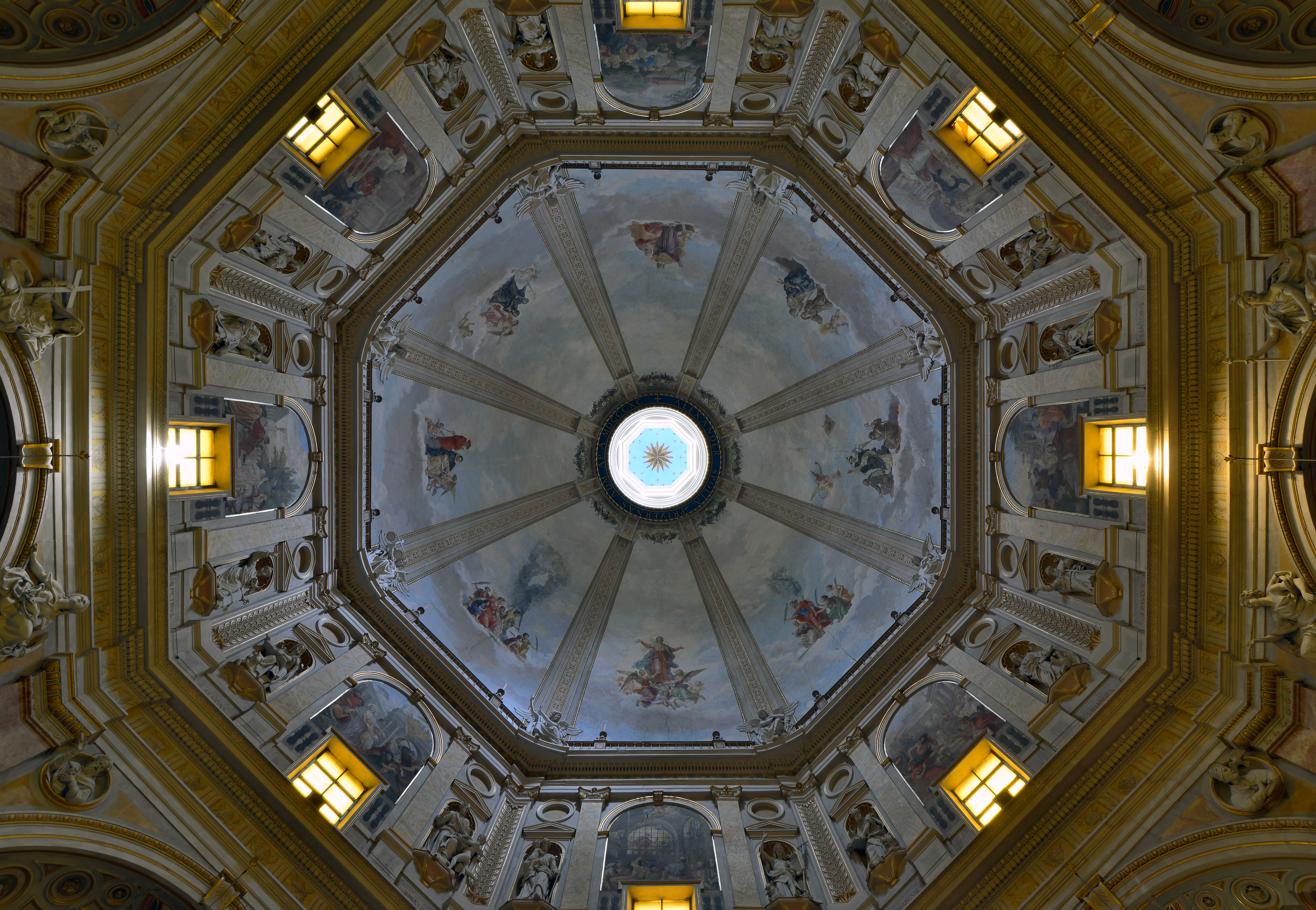
Interior of the dome

When Pope Urban V established the Diocese of Montefiascone in 1396, the church that was the most popular and most central was chosen to be the cathedral of the new diocese, after which major reconstruction began.

The building from the crypt up to the base of the dome dates from the 15th and 16th centuries and was undertaken by the Veronese architect Michele Sanmicheli, probably with the help of Antonio da Sangallo the Younger. At this time the lower church was created, and the plans for the upper church drawn up, although for economic reasons this phase of building stopped at the level of the roof, and the cathedral remained open to the elements until 1602.

After a fire during the night of Good Friday in 1670 destroyed the roof and part of the interior of the cathedral, the repair and completion of the construction was entrusted to Carlo Fontana, who amended Sanmicheli's plans to produce a dome more in keeping with contemporary taste which was to impact decisively on the landscape of the surrounding countryside. The new dome was opened on 16 December 1674.

The bell towers and west front were designed and added in 1840 by the architect Paul Gazola, using very simple elements of decoration: the statues of Saint Flavian of Montefiascone and Saint Margaret of Antioch, the principal saints worshipped in Montefiascone, and a classical tympanum supported by Ionic columns and surmounted by the arms of Cardinal Macchi.

The cathedral was created a basilica minor on 26 February 1943. In 1986 the Diocese of Montefiascone was amalgamated with a number of others to form the Diocese of Viterbo, Acquapendente, Bagnoregio, Montefiascone, Tuscania e San Martino al Monte Cimino, and the church ceased to be an episcopal seat.

== Contents ==
Besides a marble statue and some relics of Saint Margaret of Antioch, the cathedral contains the relics of Saint Lucia Filippini and the tomb of Cardinal Marco Antonio Barbarigo, and also a well-known wooden cross.

== See also ==
- Late medieval domes
- 17th-century Western domes

== Sources ==
- Ballorotto, Agostino, et al., 1992: Montefiascone e la Basilica di Santa Margherita. Montefiascone: Banca cattolica di Montefiascone
