= Carlo Carafa (presbyter) =

Italian cleric (1561–1633)

The Venerable Carlo Carafa
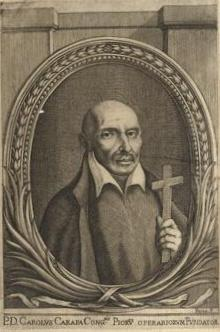

Personal details
- Born: 1561 Mariglianella, Italy
- Died: 8 September 1633 (aged 71–72) Naples, Italy

The Venerable Carlo Carafa (Mariglianella, 1561 – Naples, 8 September 1633) was an Italian presbyter and founder of Congregation of Pious Workers.

== Biography ==
Carlo Carafa was born in 1561 and joined the Society of Jesus at the age of sixteen. After five years in the Society, constant ill-health forced him to leave. Eventually he decided to enter the army. One day while passing the Palazzo Reale di Napoli, he happened to hear the nuns chanting at the Monastery of Regina Caeli and stopped to listen. Carafa decided to make a change and at the age of thirty-four, took up the study of philosophy and theology. Five years later he was ordained. After this his life became a constant exercise of charity and zeal. Cardinal Giesualdo, seeing his good work, assigned him to the church of Santa Maria di Tutti i Beni. Several ecclesiastics who were under his spiritual guidance left their homes to live with him and aid him in his apostolic labors, which the archbishop allowed.

In 1601 Carafa opened his church, and, with eight priests, he began to work. He faced many trials: he was misrepresented at Rome; he had to leave the church which had been given to him, and most of his disciples abandoned him. But he kept up his courage, rented a house and continued his work with three companions, who had remained faithful. Some time after, his perseverance was rewarded by new accessions to his community. This enabled him to establish several houses of his congregation. He obtained for it the approbation of Pope Gregory XV by a Brief of 1621. It received the title of Congregation of the Pious Workers. After a life of great merit, spent in works of charity, he died on 8 September 1633. He was declared a Servant of God on 18 September 1740, and The Venerable on 16 December 1832.
