= Filippini Sisters =

Roman Catholic religious congregation for women

The Pontifical Institute of the Religious Teachers Filippini (abbreviated as M.P.F. from the Italian: Maestre Pie Filippini), known also as the Sisters of St. Lucy Filippini, or simply the Filippini Sisters, is a Catholic religious institute devoted to education. They were founded in Italy in 1692 by Saint Lucy Filippini and Cardinal Marcantonio Barbarigo. The Religious Teachers Filippini operate schools, hospitals, orphanages, and engage in other ministries in Albania, Brazil, Eritrea, Ethiopia, India, Italy, Ireland, Switzerland, the United Kingdom, and the United States.

== History ==
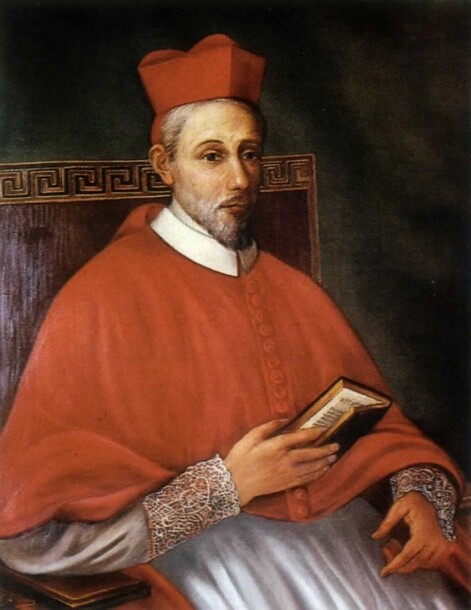
Cardinal Barbarigo

Cardinal Barbarigo was the Bishop of Montefiascone and worked in the spirit of the reforms of the Council of Trent to provide a moral and human reform to society. He was aware of the deep ignorance among the poor and was seeking to find a way of influencing a healthy family life.

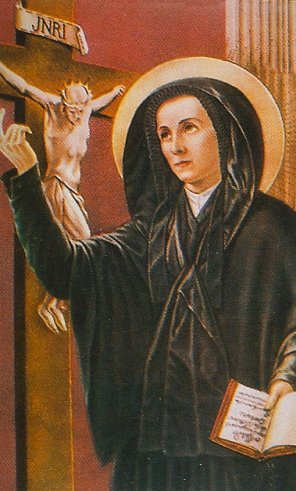
Lucia Filippini

Barbarigo came to hear of the success of a free school opened by Rose Venerini in the nearby city of Viterbo, the first in Italy. He invited Venerini to come to his diocese to establish similar schools. She accepted the invitation and arrived in Montefiascone in 1692, where she spent the next two years establishing schools throughout the diocese. Having established 10 schools, she was called back to her own diocese, and left the school building project to Lucy Filippini. The young ladies of Montefiascone were taught domestic arts, weaving, embroidering, reading, and Christian doctrine. Twelve years later, the Cardinal devised a set of rules to guide Lucy and her followers in the religious life. Fifty-two schools were established during Lucy's lifetime. The "Institute of the Maestre Pie" founded and maintained girls’ schools in that diocese and beyond. As the Community grew, it attracted the attention of Pope Clement XI, who, in 1707, called Lucy to Rome to start schools. The institute, which came to be known as the Religious Teachers Filippini, is credited with the religious and social improvement of Italian women well before compulsory education.

During World War II, in accordance with the wishes of Pope Pius XII, three of the institute's convents in Rome (in Via delle Botteghe Oscure, in Via Caboto and in Via delle Fornaci) concealed and sheltered 114 people for over a year. According to Sr. Domenica Mitaritonna, "The Religious Teachers Filippini taught during the day and at night they would take turns to be on guard to protect their guests." At the end of the war, a group of Jewish women whom the sisters in Via delle Botteghe Oscure had sheltered, presented the sisters with a statue of Our Lady of Fatima. It was installed in the area where the refugees had lived with the sisters.

== United States ==
In 1910, in response to a request by Msgr. Luigi Pozzi, pastor of St. Joachim's parish in South Trenton, New Jersey for sisters to work among his Italian parishioners, Pope Pius X sent five sisters to America. They disembarked in New York from the steamship St. Anne on 17 August 1910. In 1918, with a donation from James Cox Brady, Bishop Thomas J. Walsh of Trenton arranged the purchase of the Harvey Fisk estate, called "Riverside," for a motherhouse and novitiate for the sisters. In 1933, they established Villa Victoria Academy for girls.

After he was named Bishop of Newark, he invited the sisters to expand their activities to his new diocese and acquired the Gillespie estate for their use. The motherhouse of the US province is located at Villa Walsh in Morristown, New Jersey. Among other schools, the sisters staffed that of Our Lady of Sorrows in Jersey City, New Jersey. The sisters have an Associates program by which laywomen may join in the spirituality and apostolates of the sisters.

Filippini built the Religious Teachers Filippini into an international order. The Teachers operate schools, hospitals, orphanages, and other ministries in Albania, Brazil, Eritrea, Ethiopia, India, Italy, Ireland, Switzerland, the United Kingdom, and the United States.
