= Lucy Filippini =

18th-century Roman Catholic saint

Saint Lucy Filippini
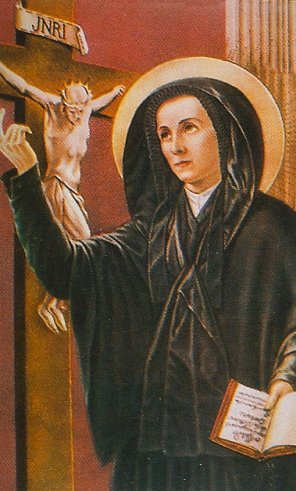

Religious
- Born: 13 January 1672; Corneto-Tarquinia, Papal States
- Died: 25 March 1732 (aged 60); Montefiascone, Papal States
- Venerated in: Roman Catholic Church
- Beatified: 13 June 1926, Saint Peter's Basilica, Kingdom of Italy by Pope Pius XI
- Canonized: 22 June 1930, Saint Peter's Basilica, Vatican City by Pope Pius XI
- Major shrine: Montefiascone Cathedral
- Feast: 25 March
- Attributes: Religious habit
- Patronage: Religious Teachers Filippini

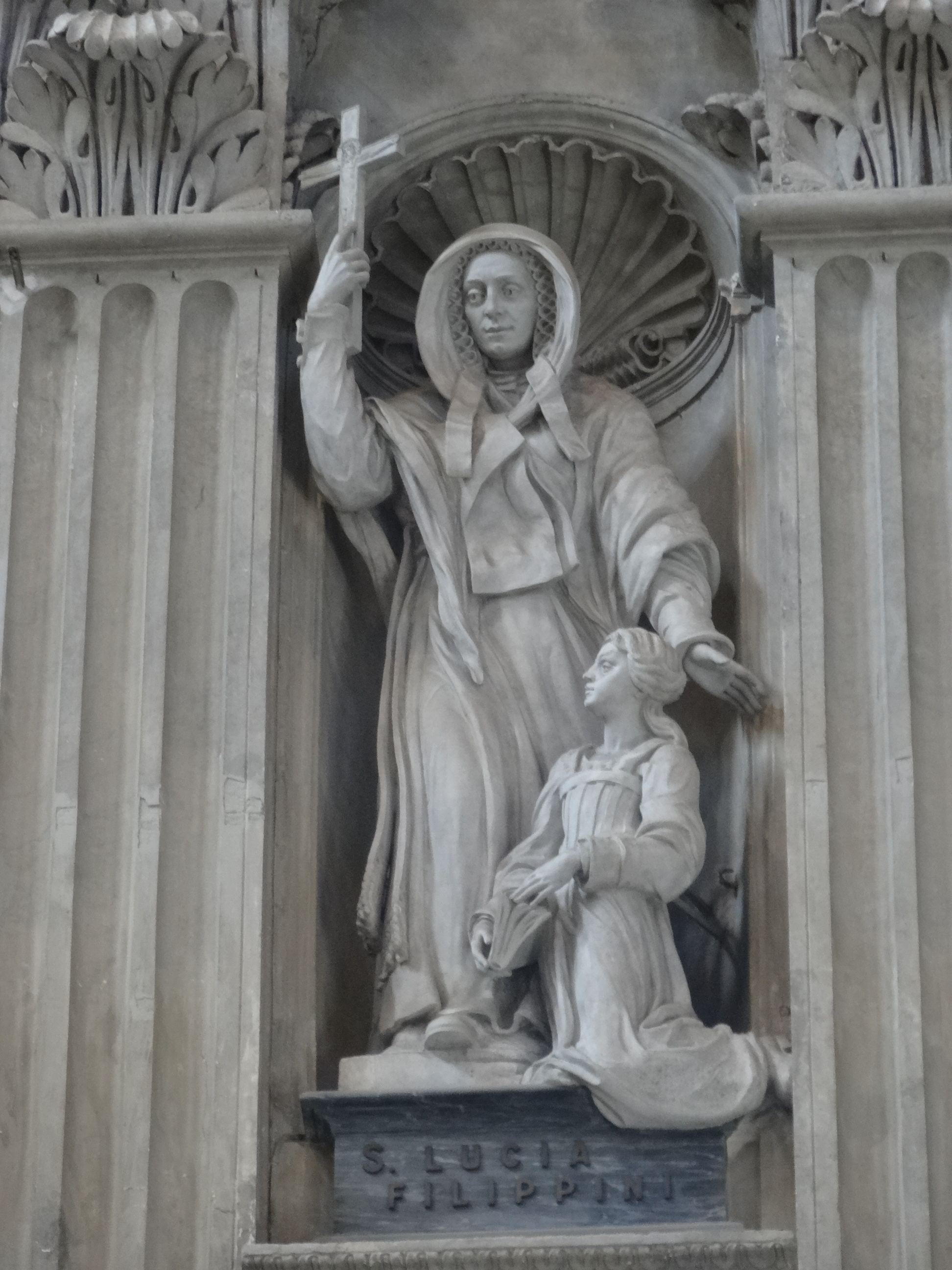
Lucy Filippini, Statue in Saint Peter's Basilica by Silvio Silva, 1949

Lucy Filippini (Italian: Santa Lucia Filippini; 13 January 1672 – 25 March 1732) is venerated as a Catholic saint.

With the assistance of Cardinal Giovanni Francesco Barbarigo, Rose Venerini founded schools for young women, especially the poor, in Viterbo. The cardinal's relative Cardinal Marcantonio Barbarigo invited Venerini to establish schools in his diocese of Montefiascone. When Venerini had to return to Viterbo to look after the establishments there, Marcantonio entrusted the schools to Lucy Filippini. She then founded the Institute of the Maestre Pie to staff the schools and continue her work. They are known as the "Filippini Sisters".

== Life ==
Lucy Filippini was born on 13 January 1672 in Corneto-Tarquinia. She was the fifth and youngest child of Filippo Filippini and Maddalena Picchi. She had not yet reached her first birthday when her mother died and was buried in the Church of San Marco. Her father, whom she loved dearly, also died six years later and was buried in the Church of Santa Margherita in Corneto. She was orphaned at an early age. At the age of six, she went to live with her aristocratic aunt and uncle who encouraged her religious inclination by entrusting her education to the Benedictine nuns at Santa Lucia.

Her career began under the patronage of Cardinal Marcantonio Barbarigo, who entrusted her with the work of founding schools for young women, especially the poor. In 1692, with Rose Venerini to train school teachers, she co-founded with Barbarigo the Pious Teachers (Religious Teachers Filippini), a group dedicated to the education of girls. The young ladies of Montefiascone were taught domestic arts, weaving, embroidering, reading, and Christian doctrine. Twelve years later, the Cardinal devised a set of rules to guide Lucy and her followers in the religious life. Fifty-two schools were established during Lucy's lifetime.

In 1707, Pope Clement XI called Lucy to Rome to start schools which he placed under his special protection. Religious Teachers Filippini, is credited with the religious and social improvement of Italian women well before compulsory education.

She died of breast cancer in 1732, aged 60, at Montefiascone. She is buried at The Cathedral of Montefiascone.

== Veneration ==
Lucy Filippini was canonized on 22 June 1930. She was given the last niche at St. Peter's Basilica and her statue can be seen in the first upper niche from the main entrance on the left (south) side of the nave of the Basilica. Her feast day is 25 March.

== See also ==
- Religious Teachers Filippini
