= Provinces of the Netherlands =

- Clickable map of provinces
- Category: Unitary unit
- Location: the Netherlands
- Number: 12 provinces 3 special municipalities
- Populations: Least: Zeeland, 391,124; Most: South Holland, 3,804,906
- Areas: Smallest (including water): Utrecht, 1,560 km^{2} (602 sq mi); Largest (including water): Friesland, 5,753 km^{2} (2,221 sq mi)
- Government: Provincial executive
- Subdivisions: Municipalities

There are twelve provinces (Dutch: provincies [proːˈvɪnsis] or provinciën [proːˈvɪnsijə(n)]; sing. provincie [ˌproːˈvɪnsi]) of the Netherlands representing the administrative layer between the national government and the local governments, with responsibility for matters of subnational or regional importance.

The most populous province is South Holland, with just over 3.8 million inhabitants as of January 2023, and also the most densely populated province with 1,410/km^{2} (3,700/sq mi). With 391,124 inhabitants, Zeeland has the smallest population. However, Drenthe is the least densely populated province with 191/km^{2} (490/sq mi). In terms of area, Friesland is the largest province with a total area of 5,753 km^{2} (2,221 sq mi). If water is excluded, Gelderland is the largest province by land area at 4,960 km^{2} (1,915 sq mi). The province of Utrecht is the smallest with a total area of 1,560 km^{2} (602 sq mi), while Flevoland is the smallest by land area at 1,410 km^{2} (544 sq mi). In total about 10,000 people were employed by the provincial administrations in 2018.

The provinces of the Netherlands are joined in the Association of Provinces of the Netherlands (IPO). This organisation promotes the common interests of the provinces in the national government of the Netherlands in The Hague.

== Politics and governance ==
The government of each province consists of three major parts:

- The provincial council (Provinciale Staten) is the provincial parliament elected every four years. The number of members varies between 39 and 55 (since 2015), depending on the number of inhabitants of the province. Being a member is a part-time job. The main task of the provincial council is to scrutinise the work of the provincial government.
- The provincial executive (Gedeputeerde Staten) is a collegial body supported by a majority in the provincial council charged with most executive tasks. Each province has between three and seven deputies, each having their own portfolio. The task of the Provincial Executive is the overall management of the province.
- The king's commissioner (commissaris van de Koning) is a single person appointed by the Crown who presides over the provincial council as well as over the provincial executive. The commissioner is appointed for a term of six years, after which reappointment for another term is possible.

=== Elections ===
The members of the provincial council are elected every four years in direct elections. To a large extent, the same political parties are enlisted in these elections in the national elections. The chosen provincial legislators elect the members of the national Senate within three months after the provincial elections. The elections for the water boards take place on the same date as the provincial elections.

The last provincial elections were held in 2023. The next provincial elections are scheduled for 2027.

== Competencies ==
The provinces of the Netherlands have seven core tasks:

1. Sustainable spatial development, including water management
2. Environment, energy and climate
3. Vital countryside
4. Regional accessibility and regional public transport
5. Regional economy
6. Cultural infrastructure and preservation
7. Quality of public administration

=== Financing ===
To a large extent, the provinces of the Netherlands are financed by the national government. Also, provinces have income from a part of the Vehicle Excise Duty. Several provinces have made a large profit in the past from privatising utility companies originally owned or partly owned by the provinces. Essent, which was originally owned by six provinces and more than a hundred municipalities, was sold for around 9.3 billion euros.

== List ==
The constituent country of the Netherlands, being the largest part of the Kingdom of the Netherlands, is divided into twelve provinces (provincies in Dutch) and three overseas special municipalities; Bonaire, Sint Eustatius, and Saba in the Caribbean Netherlands that are not part of any province. Previously these were part of public bodies (openbare lichamen).

=== European Netherlands ===
Flag	Location	Province	Capital	Largest municipality	King's Commissioner	Political party	Municipalities (since 2023)	Total area		Land area		Water area		Population (1 January 2023)	Density Land		GRDP in million euros (2019)	GRDP per capita (€; 2019)
Flag	Location	Province	Capital	Largest municipality	King's Commissioner	Political party	Municipalities (since 2023)	km^{2}	mi^{2}	km^{2}	mi^{2}	km^{2}	mi^{2}	Population (1 January 2023)	/km^{2}	/mi^{2}	GRDP in million euros (2019)	GRDP per capita (€; 2019)
Drenthe		Drenthe	Assen	Emmen	Agnes Mulder	CDA	12	2,680	1,035	2,633	1,016	48	18	502,051	191	490	15,701	31,853
Flevoland		Flevoland	Lelystad	Almere	Arjen Gerritsen	VVD	6	2,412	931	1,410	544	1,002	387	444,701	315	820	14,756	35,151
		Friesland	Leeuwarden		Arno Brok	VVD	18	5,753	2,221	3,340	1,290	2,413	932	659,551	197	510	20,728	31,947
Gelderland		Gelderland	Arnhem	Nijmegen	Daniel Wigboldus	CDA	51	5,136	1,983	4,960	1,915	176	68	2,133,708	430	1,100	81,757	39,326
Groningen		Groningen	Groningen		René Paas	CDA	10	2,955	1,141	2,316	894	639	247	596,075	257	670	24,669	42,174
Limburg		Limburg	Maastricht		Emile Roemer	SP	31	2,210	853	2,145	828	65	25	1,128,367	526	1,360	45,848	41,058
		North Brabant	's-Hertogenbosch (Note: Also Den Bosch in Dutch.)	Eindhoven	Ina Adema	VVD	56	5,082	1,962	4,902	1,892	181	70	2,626,210	536	1,390	120,869	47,328
North Holland		North Holland	Haarlem (Note: Amsterdam is the national capital of the Netherlands. Haarlem is, however, the capital of the province in which both Amsterdam and Haarlem are situated.)	Amsterdam	Arthur van Dijk	VVD	44	4,092	1,580	2,663	1,028	1,429	552	2,952,622	1,109	2,870	177,733	62,005
Overijssel		Overijssel	Zwolle	Enschede	Andries Heidema	CU	25	3,421	1,321	3,317	1,281	104	40	1,184,333	357	920	45,517	39,258
South Holland		South Holland	The Hague (Note: Den Haag in Dutch. The Dutch parliament and the Dutch government are located in The Hague along with the Supreme Court and the Council of State.)	Rotterdam	Wouter Kolff	VVD	50	3,308	1,277	2,698	1,042	609	235	3,804,906	1,410	3,700	169,118	45,815
		Utrecht	Utrecht		Hans Oosters	PvdA	26	1,560	602	1,484	573	76	29	1,387,643	935	2,420	77,445	57,431
Zeeland		Zeeland	Middelburg	Terneuzen	Hugo de Jonge	CDA	13	2,933	1,133	1,780	687	1,154	445	391,124	220	570	14,391	37,549
Netherlands		Netherlands	Amsterdam				342	41,543	16,040	33,647	12,991	7,896	3,049	17,811,291	529	1,370	810,247	46,714

=== Caribbean Netherlands ===
Flag	Special Municipality	Capital	Largest city	Area	Population (2019)	Density
	Bonaire	Kralendijk		294 km^{2} (114 sq mi)	20,104	69/km^{2} (180/sq mi)
	Sint Eustatius	Oranjestad		21 km^{2} (8.1 sq mi)	3,138	150/km^{2} (390/sq mi)
	Saba	The Bottom		13 km^{2} (5.0 sq mi)	1,915	148/km^{2} (380/sq mi)
Total				328 km^{2} (127 sq mi)	25,157	77/km^{2} (200/sq mi)

== History ==
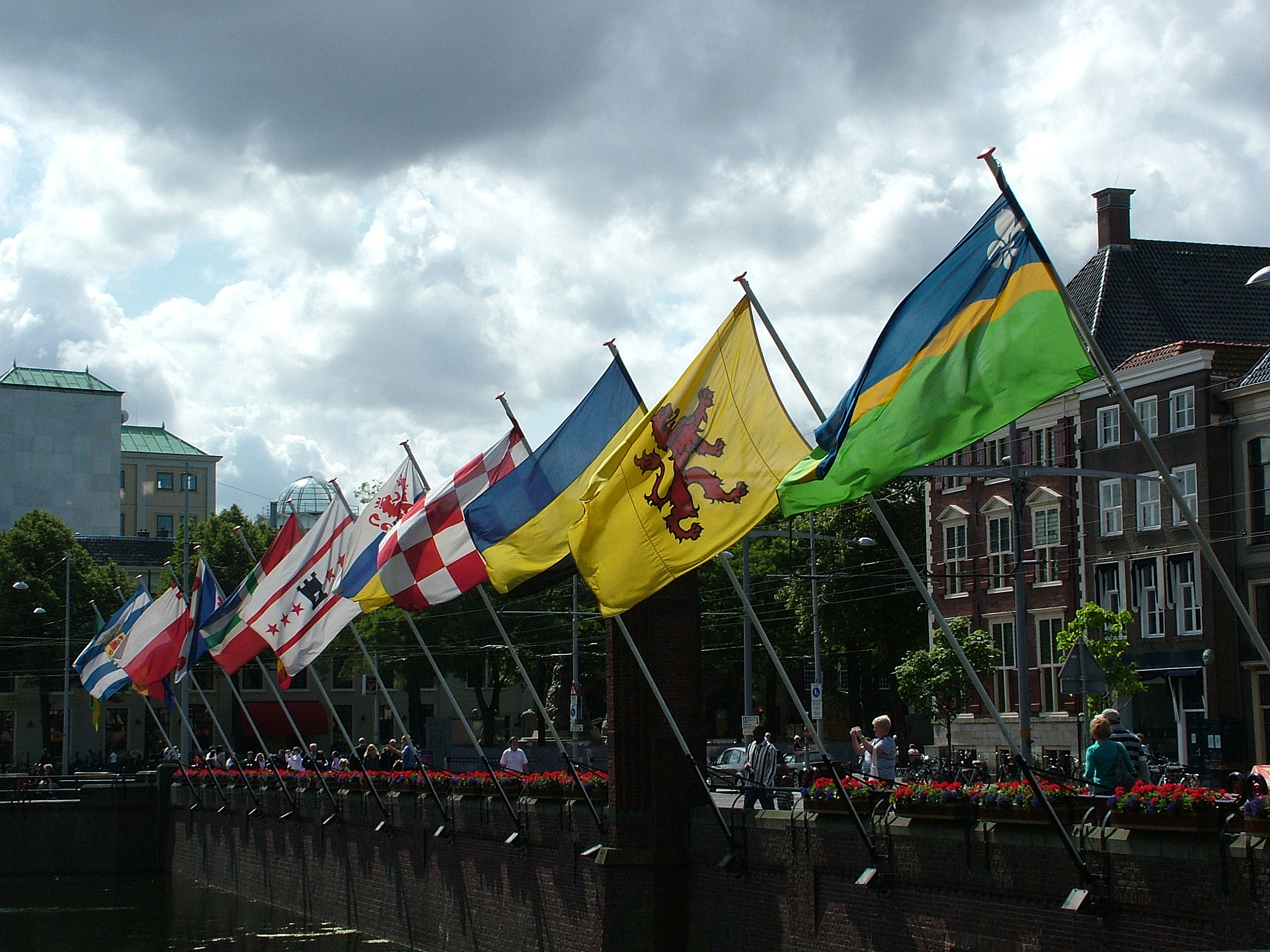
Flags of the provinces near the Hofvijver in The Hague

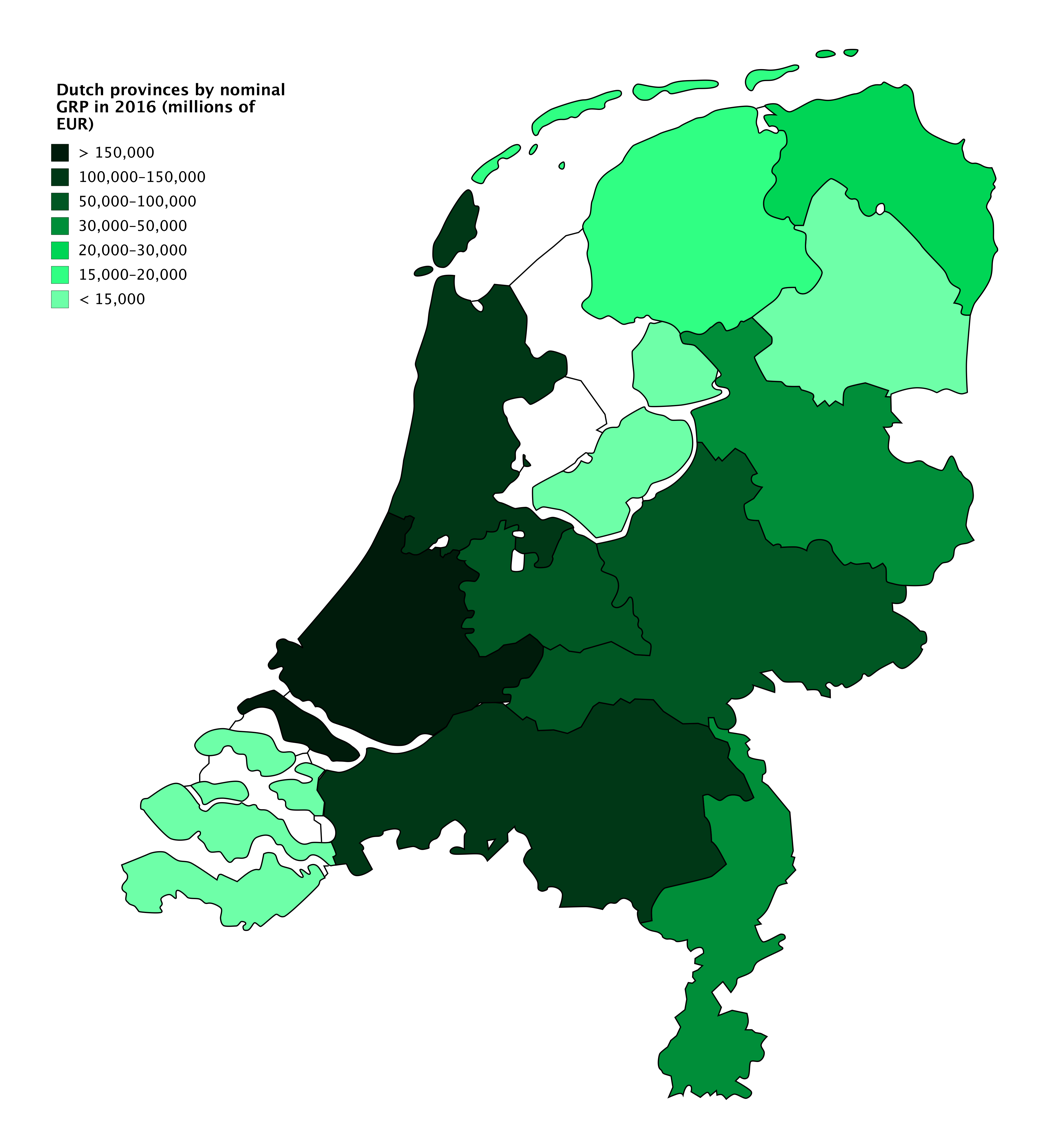
Dutch provinces by nominal GRDP in 2016

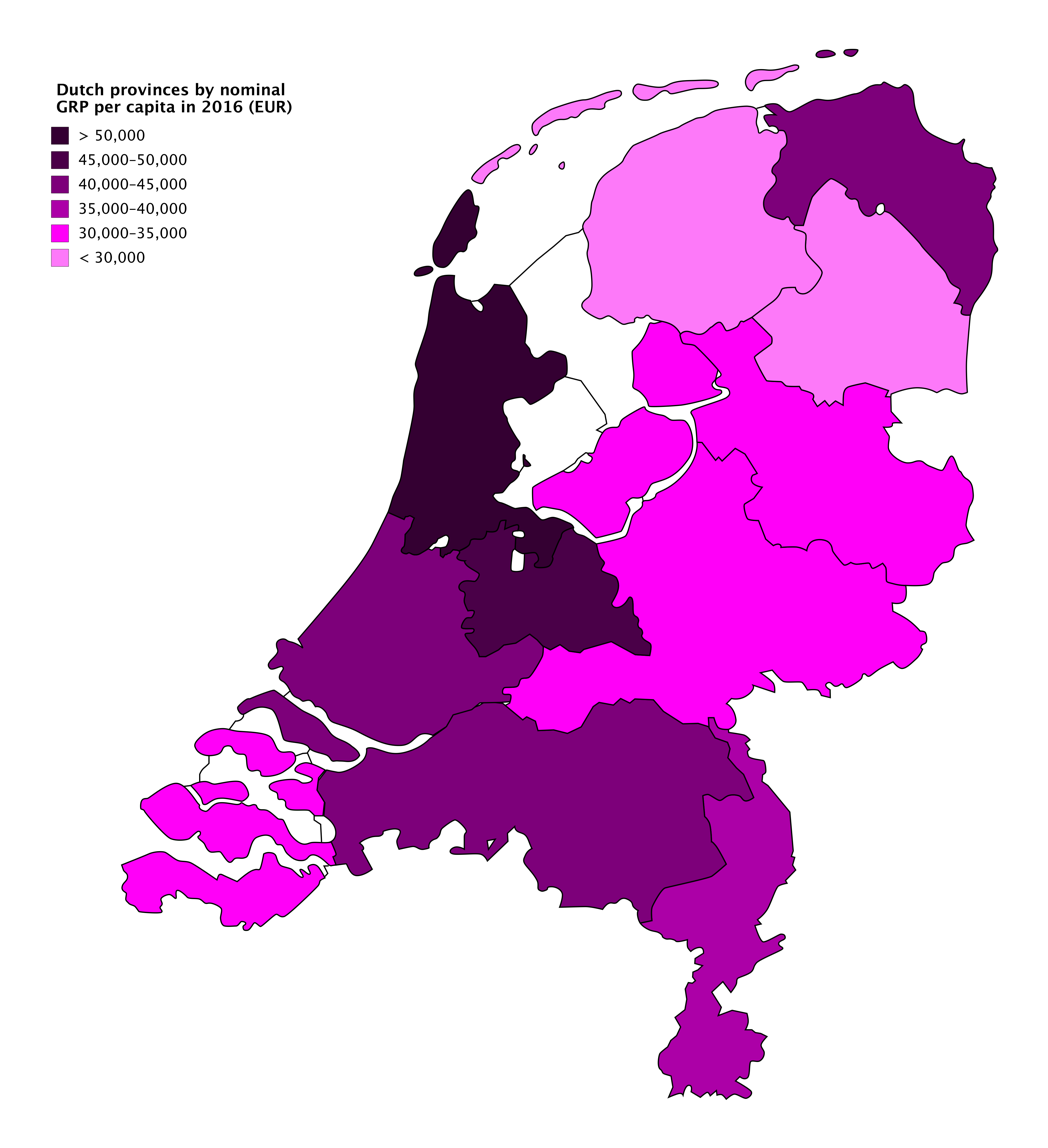
Dutch provinces by nominal GRDP per capita in 2016

Nearly all Dutch provinces can trace their origin to a medieval county or duchy, as can the provinces of regions in Belgium. Their status changed when they came under a single ruler who centralised their administration, reducing their powers. There were 17 in total: from these unified Netherlands, seven northern provinces from 1588 formed the Republic of the Seven United Provinces, namely three counties of Holland and Zeeland, the duchy of Gelderland, and the Lordships of Utrecht, Friesland, Overijssel and Groningen.

The Republic also included the country of Drenthe, which retained its own provincial institutions but was not represented in the States General, as well as several territories governed directly by the States General as Generality Lands. These included Staats-Brabant, comprising much of the northern part of the Duchy of Brabant and lying largely in the present-day province of North Brabant; Staats-Vlaanderen, comprising the northern part of the County of Flanders and corresponding largely to present-day Zeelandic Flanders; and Staats-Overmaas, consisting of the State-held portions of the Lands of Valkenburg, Dalhem and 's-Hertogenrade, mostly within present-day Dutch Limburg. Staats-Overmaas was distinct from the historic Duchy of Limburg, which remained in the Spanish and later Austrian Netherlands which became present day Belgium. From 1715, the Generality Lands also included Staats-Opper-Gelre, formed from part of Upper Guelders and centred on Venlo, which likewise forms part of the present-day province of Dutch Limburg.

Each of these "Netherlands" had a high degree of autonomy, cooperating with each other mainly on defense and foreign relations, but otherwise keeping to their own affairs.

On 1 January 1796, under the Batavian Republic, Drenthe and Staats-Brabant became the eighth and ninth provinces of the Netherlands. The latter, which had been known as Bataafs Brabant (English: Batavian Brabant), changed its name to Noord-Brabant, North Brabant, in 1815 when it became part of the United Kingdom of the Netherlands, which also contained (then) South Brabant, a province now in Belgium. This new unified state featured the provinces in their modern form, as non-autonomous subdivisions of the national state, and again numbering 17, though they were not all the same as the 16th century ones. In 1839, following the separation of Belgium, the province of Limburg was divided between the two countries, each now having a province called Limburg. A year later, Holland, the largest and most populous of the Dutch provinces, was also split into two provinces, for a total of 11. The 12th province to be created was Flevoland, consisting almost entirely of reclaimed land, established on 1 January 1986.

=== French period ===
During the Batavian Republic, the Netherlands was from 1798 to 1801 completely reorganised into eight new departments, most named after rivers, inspired by the French revolutionary example, in an attempt to do away with the old semi-autonomous status of the provinces. They are listed below, with their capitals and the territory of the former provinces that they mostly incorporated:

Batavian Departments
English name	Dutch name	Capital	Territory contained
Department of the Ems	Departement van de Eems	Leeuwarden	Northern Friesland, Groningen
Department of the Old IJssel	Departement van de Oude IJssel	Zwolle	Southern Friesland, Drenthe, Overijssel, Northern Gelderland
Department of the Rhine	Departement van de Rijn	Arnhem	Central Gelderland, Eastern Utrecht
Department of the Amstel	Departement van de Amstel	Amsterdam	Area around Amsterdam
Department of Texel	Departement van Texel	Alkmaar	Northern Holland minus Amsterdam, Northwestern Utrecht
Department of the Delft	Departement van de Delft	Delft	Southern Holland up to the Meuse, Southwestern Utrecht
Department of the Dommel	Departement van de Dommel	's-Hertogenbosch	Eastern Batavian Brabant, Southern Gelderland
Department of the Scheldt and Meuse	Departement van de Schelde en Maas	Middelburg	Zeeland, Southern Holland under the Meuse and Western Batavian Brabant

After only three years, following a coup d'état, the borders of the former provinces were restored, though not their autonomous status. They were now also called "departments" and Drenthe was added to Overijssel. In 1806 the Kingdom of Holland replaced the republic to further French interests. It was during this administration that Holland was first split in two, with the department of Amstelland to the north and that of Maasland to the south. East Frisia, then as now in Germany, was added to the kingdom as a department in 1807 and Drenthe split off again making a total of 11 departments.

When the Netherlands finally did become fully part of France in 1810, the departments of the kingdom and their borders were largely maintained, with some joined. They were however nearly all renamed, again mainly after rivers, though the names differed from their Batavian counterparts. Following are their names and the modern day province they mostly correspond to:

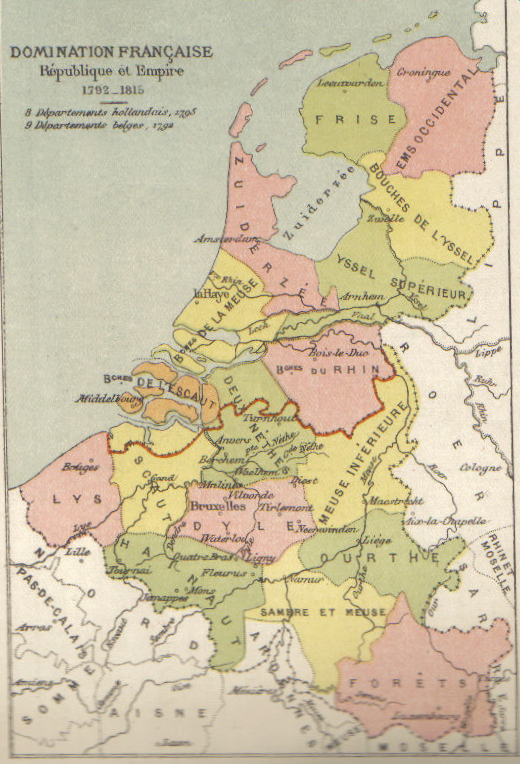
Map of the subdivisions of the Netherlands during French administration; East Frisia is not included in this later map

French departments in the Netherlands
English name	French name	Dutch name	Modern territory
Department of the Zuiderzee	Département du Zuyderzée	Departement van de Zuiderzee	North Holland and Utrecht
Department of the Mouths of the Meuse	Département des Bouches-de-la-Meuse	Departement van de Monden van de Maas	South Holland
Department of the Mouths of the Scheldt	Département des Bouches-de-l'Escaut	Departement van de Monden van de Schelde	Zeeland
Department of the Two Nethes	Département des Deux-Nèthes	Departement van de Twee Nethen	Western North Brabant and Antwerp
Department of the Mouths of the Rhine	Département des Bouches-du-Rhin	Departement van de Monden van de Rijn	Eastern North Brabant and southern Gelderland
Department of the Upper IJssel	Département de l'Yssel-Supérieur	Departement van de Boven IJssel	Northern Gelderland
Department of the Mouths of the IJssel	Département des Bouches-de-l'Yssel	Departement van de Monden van de IJssel	Overijssel
Department of Frisia	Département de la Frise	Departement Friesland	Friesland
Department of the Western Ems	Département de l'Ems-Occidental	Departement van de Wester Eems	Groningen and Drenthe
Department of the Eastern Ems	Département de l'Ems-Oriental	Departement van de Ooster Eems	East Frisia

With the end of French rule in 1813–1814, the Northern Netherlands largely returned to their pre-revolutionary provincial names and divisions, while East Frisia, which had formed part of the Kingdom of Holland and subsequently France, was assigned to the Kingdom of Hanover in 1815. The seventeen provinces of the United Kingdom of the Netherlands were nevertheless not simply a restoration of the historic Seventeen Provinces. The Constitution of 1815 explicitly preserved the boundaries of the former French departments in the Southern Netherlands, but under restored historical names: the departments of Dyle, Scheldt, Lys, Jemmape and Deux-Nèthes returned respectively to the provinces of South Brabant, East Flanders, West Flanders, Hainaut and Antwerp, while Limburg, Liège and Namur were likewise formed from French departments or parts of them.

There is continuous discussion within the Netherlands about the future of the provinces. Before 2014, the national government was planning to merge the provinces Flevoland, North Holland and Utrecht into a single province Noordvleugelprovincie. Due to significant protest the plan was abandoned.

== See also ==
- ISO 3166-2:NL
- Table of administrative divisions by country
- Flags of the provinces of the Netherlands
- Coats of arms of provinces of the Netherlands
- List of provinces of the Netherlands by Human Development Index
