= Napoleon in Holland =

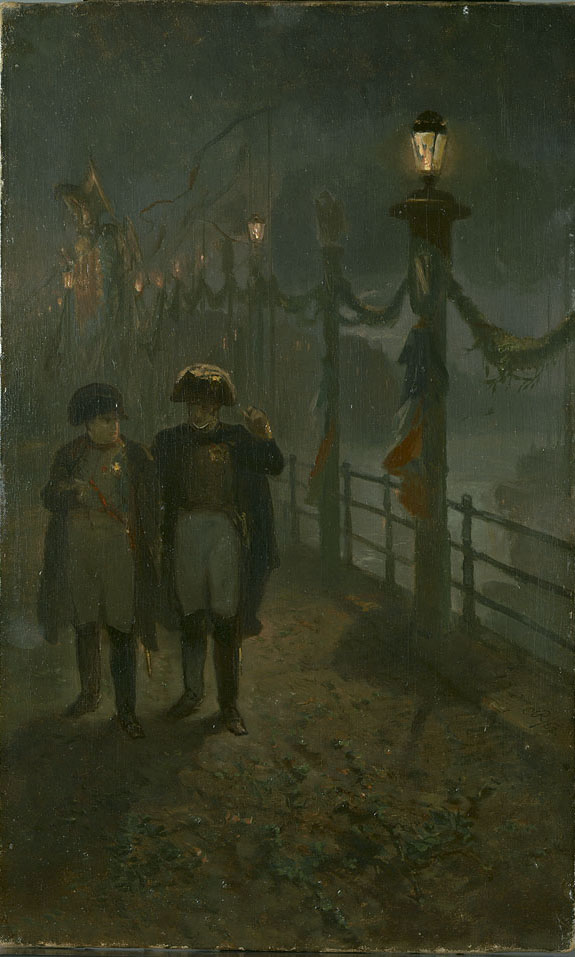
Napoleon in Amsterdam by Charles Rochussen

In late September 1811, French Emperor Napoleon I visited the former Kingdom of Holland; he explained to Armand-Augusti-Louis de Caulaincourt his goals: a blockade of trade with Britain, to form a government, and ordering the "Routes impériales".

== Holland as part of the First French Empire ==
Napoleon wanted to control every seaport in the area and on 16 March 1810, Bouches-de-l'Escaut and Bouches-du-Rhin became part of the First French Empire. King Louis Bonaparte opposed his older brother when Napoleon's troops were not only occupying the coast but went more inland. Marshal Nicolas Oudinot had arrived with 20,000 soldiers to prevent smuggling and organise the Continental System. After Napoleon threatened to occupy Amsterdam, King Louis abdicated on 1 July 1810 in favour of his second son Napoléon Louis Bonaparte, his son. Holland was annexed to France by decree on 9 July; "with Imperial coastguards, customs and police allowed to operate the smuggling staunched at last." On 18 August 1810, Napoleon ordered via decree that the Dutch army be incorporated into the French Imperial Army.

On 1 January 1811 the country was divided into seven departments: Zuyderzée, Bouches-de-la-Meuse, Yssel-Supérieur, Bouches-de-l'Yssel, Frise, Ems-Occidental and Ems-Oriental. (Note: In January 1810, the southern part of the Netherlands was already split up into Deux-Nèthes, Meuse-Inférieure, Bouches-de-l'Escaut, and Bouches-du-Rhin, but the latter two not part of "Hollande". For the sake of completeness the earlier formed departments Roer and Escaut have to be mentioned too.) The navy of the Kingdom of Holland also ceased to exist on that day, being merged with the French Imperial Navy. On 18 August 1811 Napoleon ordered by decree that everybody without a last name had to choose one before 1 January 1814. Until 17 November 1813, Charles-François Lebrun served as governor-general of Holland, reorganising its departments to be more efficient and impartial legal-wise. He was assisted by the prefects Antoine de Celles and Goswin de Stassart, with Alexander Gogel on Finance and François Jean-Baptiste d'Alphonse on Internal Affairs as "Intendant-General". The latter was responsible for the "Aperçu sur la Hollande", published in the end of April 1813, full with statistics and details.

== Visit ==
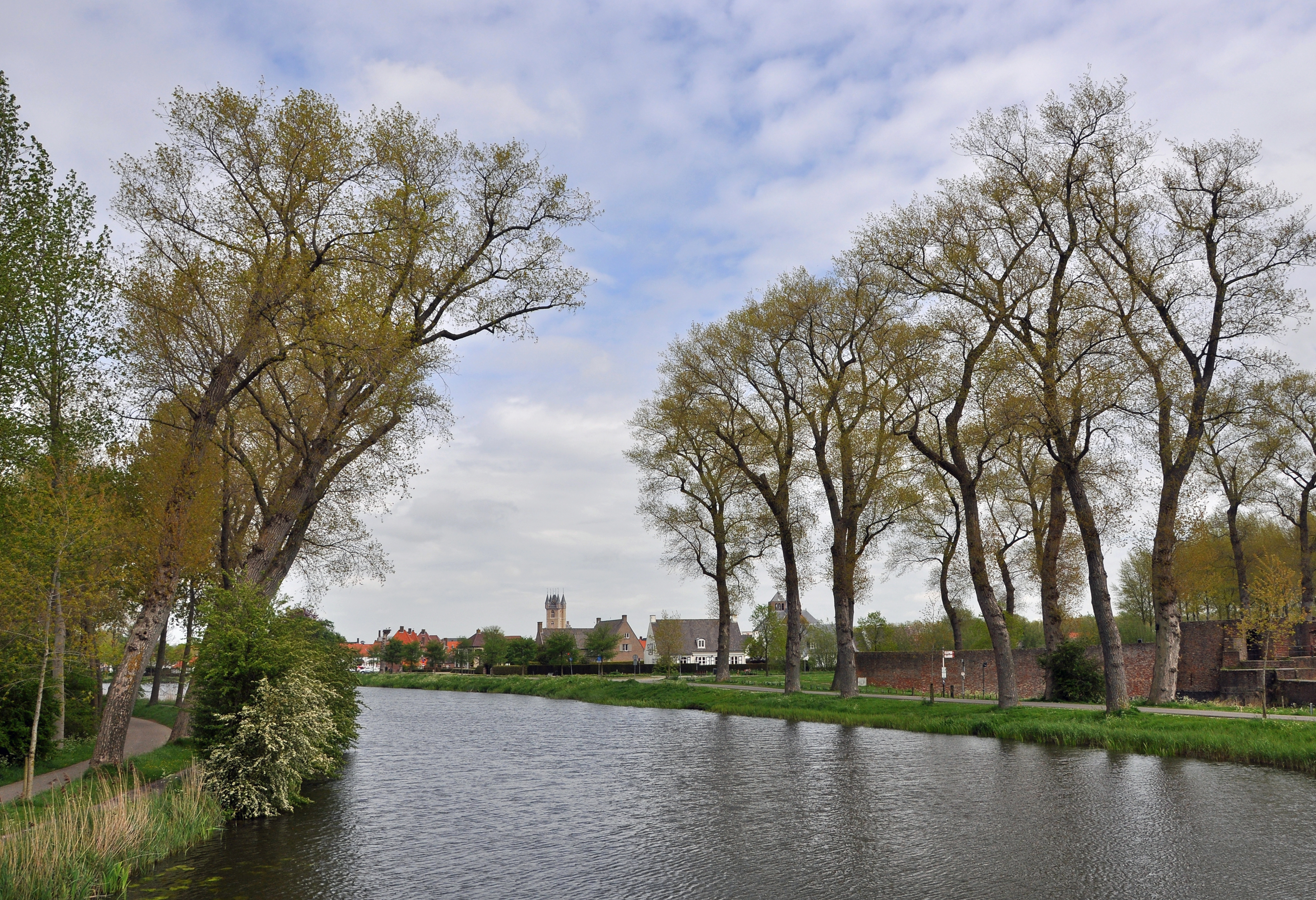
The canal between Sluis and Damme, also called Napoleon Canal

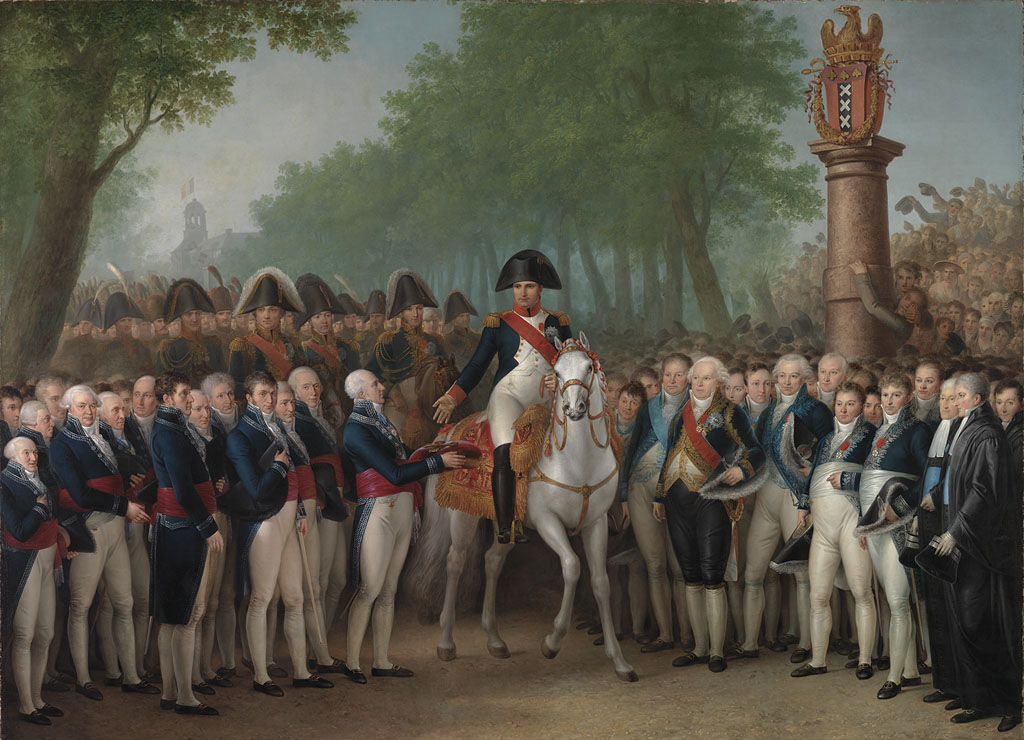
Napoleon's arrival in Amsterdam, 9 October 1811, by Mattheus Ignatius van Bree

On 24 September 1811 Napoleon arrived in Breskens, on the 27th in Vlissingen, a strategic city he had visited twice before (in 1803 and 1810). A few days later he met with his wife in Antwerp. Then they traveled north to the fortified cities of Willemstad and Hellevoetsluis. He was accompanied with 75 people and by General Dirk van Hogendorp, who would later become governor of Königsberg, Vilnius, Breslau, and Hamburg (and mentioned as one of the few in Napoleon's will). On 5 October he arrived in Gorinchem; the next day he left for Utrecht. There he met with members of the Old Catholic Church and Jews. On 9 October he arrived in Amsterdam, the third capital of his empire and stayed a fortnight in the Royal Palace of Amsterdam. With the Dutch merchants he discussed the Continental System and its intended effects on the British economy. He visited several wharves, the military barracks in Quartier Saint Charles, the fortifications on Pampus, and the Trippenhuis. In the evening François-Joseph Talma gave a performance of Andromaque. Via Broek in Waterland and Medemblik Napoleon traveled to Den Helder, which was in Napoleon's view the most important naval base in the north. Vice-admiral Jan Willem de Winter, who later would be buried in the Panthéon, accompanied him to Texel, and discussed possibilities to keep the Royal Navy away from the Dutch coast. Because of a lack of funds earlier that year 4,000 Dutch fishermen were impressed into the French Imperial Navy.

Back in Amsterdam C.R.T. Krayenhoff accompanied Napoleon to see the fortifications of Muiden and Naarden. On 22 October the universities of Utrecht, Harderwijk, and Franeker were closed. Also the Athenaeums of Amsterdam and Deventer were shut. François Noël and Georges Cuvier proposed that Leiden and Groningen keep their universities. By decree, all Christian denominations received money from the municipality.

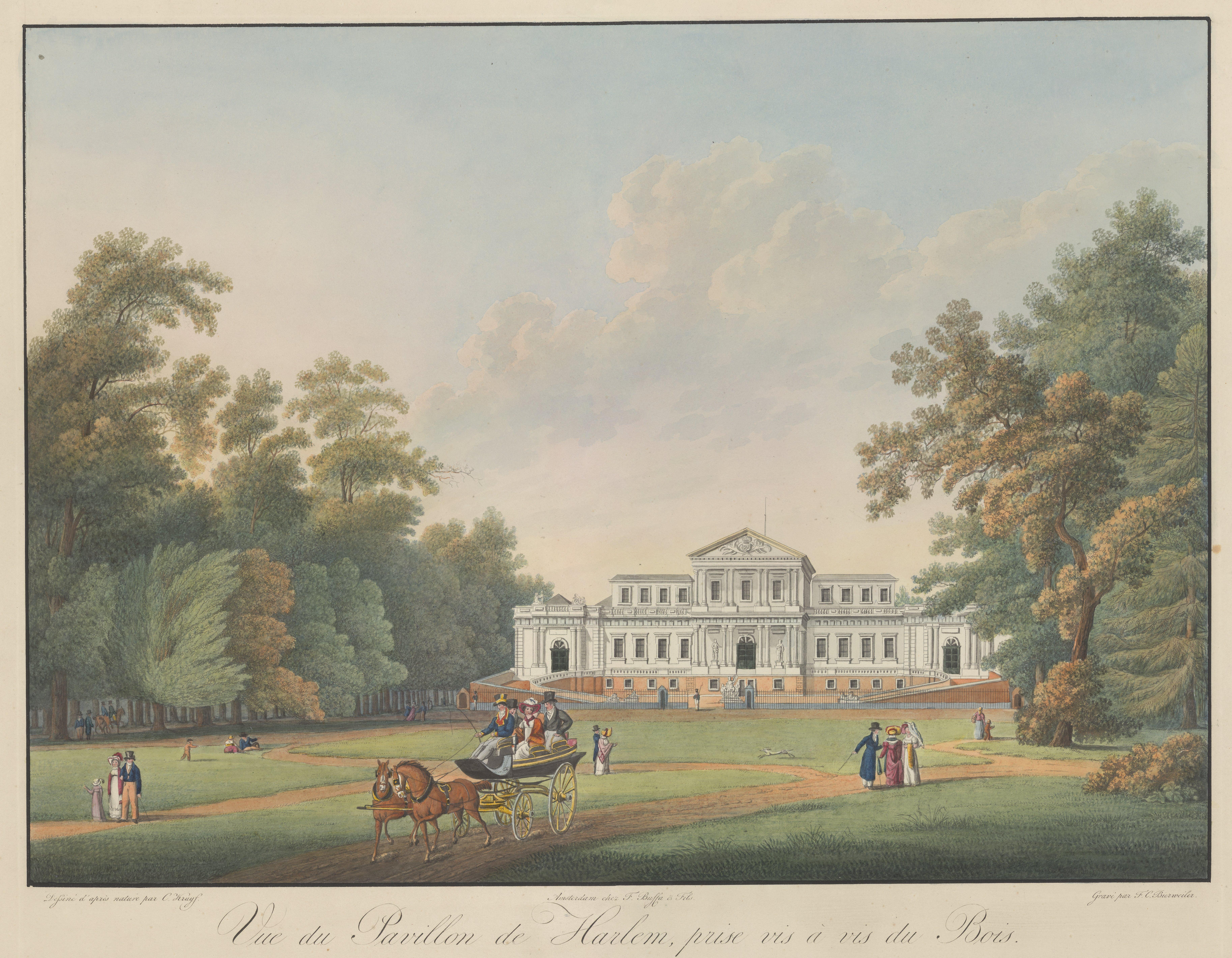
Villa Welgelegen in 1815

In Haarlem, Napoleon visited the Teylers Museum and Paviljoen Welgelegen. On his way south he visited the locks in Katwijk aan Zee. In Leiden he talked to scientists Sebald Justinus Brugmans, Gerard Sandifort, and Matthijs Siegenbeek. In The Hague he met with Cornelis Felix van Maanen, the president of the Imperial High Court and responsible for introducing the Napoleonic Code in the Netherlands. The couple stayed one night in Lange Voorhout Palace; in Rotterdam in Schielandhuis. Through Gouda, Oudewater, and Utrecht Napoleon arrived at Het Loo Palace. He visited Hattem, where Herman Willem Daendels' wife lived and Zwolle. On the last day of October he left Nijmegen and travelled to Wesel.

Before Napoleon arrived a Cadastre and civil registry were introduced. After he left, the French tax and judicial system became effective on 1 January 1812. Between 1810 and 1813 around 35,000 Dutchmen between the ages of 20 and 50 were forced to join his Grande Armée or his fleet; around 25,000 joined Napoleon to Russia. Most Dutchmen served in the 123rd, 124th, 125th, and 126th Regiment d’Infanterie de Ligne, and 33e Régiment d’Infanterie Légère.

== Legacy ==
Napoleon brought a new bureaucracy with him, such as the nationwide civil registration of births, marriages, and deaths. This benefitted the government (tracking the coming of age of taxable and conscriptable persons), but also the people. The new civil records had more consistent detail and accessibility in central repositories than the scattered religious records people had relied on previously, and the separation of church and state in record keeping is now standard in most countries.

His instruction in 1811 obliging those without a surname to choose one had an unexpected legacy, however. While surnames are standard today, many objected at the time.

== Sources ==
- Gijsberti Hodenpijl, C.F. (1904) Napoleon in Holland.
- Homan, G.D. (1978) Nederland in de Napoleontische Tijd 1795–1815.
- Joor, J. (2000) De Adelaar en het Lam. Onrust, opruiing en onwilligheid in Nederland ten tijde van het Koninkrijk Holland en de Inlijving bij het Franse Keizerrijk (1806–1813), pp. 503–510.
- Schama, S. (1987) Patriots and Liberators. Revolution in the Netherlands 1780–1830. Chapter 13 "Babylon Undone" 1810–1813.
