= Lippe (department) =

Former French department (1811–1814)

Coordinates: 51°57′N 7°37′E

Location of Lippe in France (1812)

Lippe (French pronunciation: [lip]) was a department of the First French Empire in present-day Germany. It was named after the river Lippe. It was formed in 1811, when Principality of Salm and a part of the Grand Duchy of Berg was annexed by France. Its territory is now part of the German lands of Lower Saxony and North Rhine-Westphalia. Its capital was Münster.

The department was subdivided into the following arrondissements and cantons (situation in 1812):

- Münster, cantons: Dülmen, Haltern, Münster, Nottuln and Sankt Mauritz.
- Neuenhaus, cantons: Bad Bentheim, Heede, Neuenhaus, Nordhorn and Wesuwe.
- Rees, cantons: Bocholt, Borken, Emmerich, Rees, Ringenberg and Stadtlohn.
- Steinfurt, cantons: Ahaus, Billerbeck, Coesfeld, Ochtrup, Rheine and Steinfurt.

Its population in 1812 was 339,355.

In the months before the Lippe department was formed, the arrondissements of Rees and Münster were part of Yssel-Supérieur, the arrondissement of Steinfurt was part of Bouches-de-l'Yssel and the arrondissement of Neuenhaus was part of Ems-Occidental. After Napoleon was defeated in 1814, the department was divided between the Kingdom of Hanover and Prussia.
