= Provisional Government of Belgium (1814–1815) =

Provisional Government of what is now Belgium after the Napoleonic Wars

General-Government of Belgium Algemeen Bestuur der Nederlanden (Dutch) Gouvernement Général de la Belgique (French)
- 1814–1815
- Status: Provisional government
- Capital: Brussels
- Common languages: Dutch; French; Limburgish
- Religion: Catholicism, Protestantism

Government
  - Governor-general: Frederic Augustus Alexander, Duke of Beaufort-Spontin (until February 15, 1814); Karl van der Horst (until May 6, 1814); Karl von Vincent (until August 1, 1814); William I of the Netherlands
- History
  - Established: 1814
  - Disestablished: 1815
Preceded by	Succeeded by
First French Empire	United Kingdom of the Netherlands
- Today part of: Belgium

The Provisional Government of Belgium or the General Government of Belgium governed the Southern Netherlands from February 1814 to September 1815, when the Southern Netherlands was definitively incorporated into the United Kingdom of the Netherlands. The official documents at that time were in French, in which it was labeled as 'Gouvernement Général de la Belgique' or in German as 'Generalgouvernement von Belgien'. In Dutch, it was described as 'Algemeen Bestuur der Nederlanden'.

In January 1814, by order of the Sixth coalition, represented by the Central Commission for the Administration of the Lands Recaptured from France, under the leadership of Baron vom Stein, several General Governments (Gouvernement Général) were established in the recaptured or liberated territories.

In the Treaty of Paris (1814) and the following Congress of Vienna, the Great Powers decided to transfer responsibility of the Southern Netherlands to the occupying powers of England and the Netherlands. Baron von Stein's commission was dissolved on June 15. Governor-General De Vincent was replaced by Prince William of Orange on August 1, 1814.

From March 16, 1815, until the full union with the Northern Netherlands on September 21, 1815, the government was in Personal union with the Sovereign Principality of the United Netherlands under the House of Orange-Nassau.

== Sovereign Prince William ==
The London Protocol of June 21, 1814 invited Prince William to accept the position of Governor-General of Belgium and to prepare for the unification of the Netherlands. Willem accepted this on July 21 and announced on August 1 that he was taking over the government of Belgium. On March 16, 1815, he himself assumed sovereignty. This created a personal union of the Northern and Southern Netherlands under the leadership of a Sovereign Prince.

After taking office, Willem appointed the new government on August 12, 1814, which was installed on August 15. He replaced the Administrative Council with a Secret Council (Geheime Raad). The heads of the departments were the Commissioners-General. This government was dissolved on September 16, 1815.
