= United Kingdom of the Netherlands =

European territory (1815–1839)

Kingdom of the Netherlands Koninkrijk der Nederlanden (Dutch) Royaume des Belgiques (French)
- 1815–1839 (Note: The Kingdom did not cease to exist at this time and continues to the present day; however; this is the moment when the Dutch crown relinquished its claims to Belgium and Luxembourg and recognised them as independent sovereign states.)
- Flag Coat of arms
- Motto: Je maintiendrai ("I will uphold")
- Anthem: Wien Neêrlands Bloed ("Those in whom Dutch blood")
- Location of the Netherlands in 1815; Location of Luxembourg
- Capital and largest city: Amsterdam; 52°22′N 4°53′E
- Government seat: The Hague
- Official languages: Dutch
- Recognized regional languages: French
- Common languages: Frisian; Limburgish; Low Saxon; Yiddish; Romani
- Religion: Dutch Reformed Church; Catholic Church
- Demonym: Dutch
- Government: Unitary parliamentary semi-constitutional monarchy
- King
  - 1815–1839: William I
- Legislature: States General
  - Upper house: Senate
  - Lower house: House of Representatives
- Historical era: Concert of Europe
  - Constitution adopted: 24 August 1815
  - Belgian Revolution: 25 August 1830
  - Treaty of London: 19 April 1839 (Note: The Kingdom did not cease to exist at this time and continues to the present day; however; this is the moment when the Dutch crown relinquished its claims to Belgium and Luxembourg and recognised them as independent sovereign states.)

Area
  - Total: 68,095 km^{2} (26,292 sq mi)

Population
  - 1817: 5,563,119
- Currency: Dutch guilder
Preceded by
Sovereign Principality of the United Netherlands
Provisional Government of Belgium
Succeeded by
Kingdom of the Netherlands
Belgium
Duchy of Limburg
Neutral Moresnet
- Today part of: Kingdom of the Netherlands; Belgium

The United Kingdom of the Netherlands (Note: Dutch: Verenigd Koninkrijk der Nederlanden; French: Royaume uni des Pays-Bas) is the unofficial but common historiographical name for the Kingdom of the Netherlands (Note: Dutch: Koninkrijk der Nederlanden; French: Royaume des Belgiques) as it existed from 1815 to 1839. The United Netherlands was created in the aftermath of the Napoleonic Wars through the fusion of territories that had belonged to the former Dutch Republic, Austrian Netherlands, and Prince-Bishopric of Liège in order to form a buffer state between the major European powers. The polity was a constitutional monarchy, ruled by William I of the House of Orange-Nassau.

The polity collapsed in 1830 with the outbreak of the Belgian Revolution. With the de facto secession of Belgium, the Netherlands was left as a rump state and refused to recognise Belgian independence until 1839 when the Treaty of London was signed, fixing the border between the two states and guaranteeing Belgian independence and neutrality as the Kingdom of Belgium. Today, the Netherlands and Belgium are still kingdoms and Luxembourg is still a grand duchy and the only surviving grand duchy in the world.

In French, spoken by the southern residents, this state was officially referred to by a variant of the name Belgica, the Latin name for the entire region of the Low Countries, taken from the name of the Roman province Gallia Belgica. However, after the Belgian Revolution, in which the rebels took the name of Belgium for their new country, the rump (northern) Netherlands were given the name of the direct translation for Netherlands/Low Countries (Pays-Bas).

== Background ==
Before the French Revolutionary Wars (1792–1802), the Low Countries was a patchwork of different polities created by the Eighty Years' War (1568–1648). The Dutch Republic in the north was independent; the Southern Netherlands was split between the Austrian Netherlands and the Prince-Bishopric of Liège – the former being part of Habsburg monarchy, while both were part of the Holy Roman Empire. In the aftermath of the French Revolution, the War of the First Coalition broke out in 1792 and France was invaded by Prussia and the Holy Roman Empire. After two years of fighting, the Austrian Netherlands and Liège were captured by the French in 1794 and annexed into France. The Dutch Republic collapsed in 1795 and became a French client state.

== Creation of the United Netherlands ==
In 1813, the Netherlands was liberated from French rule by Prussian and Russian troops during the Napoleonic Wars. It was taken for granted that any new regime would have to be headed by the son of the last Dutch stadhouder, William Frederik of Orange-Nassau. A provisional government was formed, most of whose members had helped drive out the House of Orange 18 years earlier. However, they realised that it would be better in the long term to offer leadership of the new government to William Frederik themselves rather than have him imposed by the allies. Accordingly, William Frederick was installed as the "sovereign prince" of a new Sovereign Principality of the United Netherlands. The future of the Southern Netherlands, however, was less clear. In June 1814, the Great Powers secretly agreed to the Eight Articles of London which allocated the region to the Dutch as William had advocated. That August, William Frederik was made Governor-General of the Southern Netherlands and the Prince-Bishop of Liège, which combined are almost all of what is now Belgium. For all intents and purposes, William Frederik had completed his family's three-century dream of uniting the Low Countries under a single rule.

Discussions on the future of the region were still ongoing at the Congress of Vienna when Napoleon attempted to return to power in the "Hundred Days". William used the occasion to declare himself king on 16 March 1815 as William I. After the Battle of Waterloo, discussions continued.

In exchange for the Southern Netherlands, William agreed to cede the Principality of Orange-Nassau and parts of the Liège to Prussia on 31 May 1815. In exchange, William also gained control over the Duchy of Luxembourg, which was elevated to a grand duchy and placed in personal union with the Netherlands, though it remained part of the German Confederation.

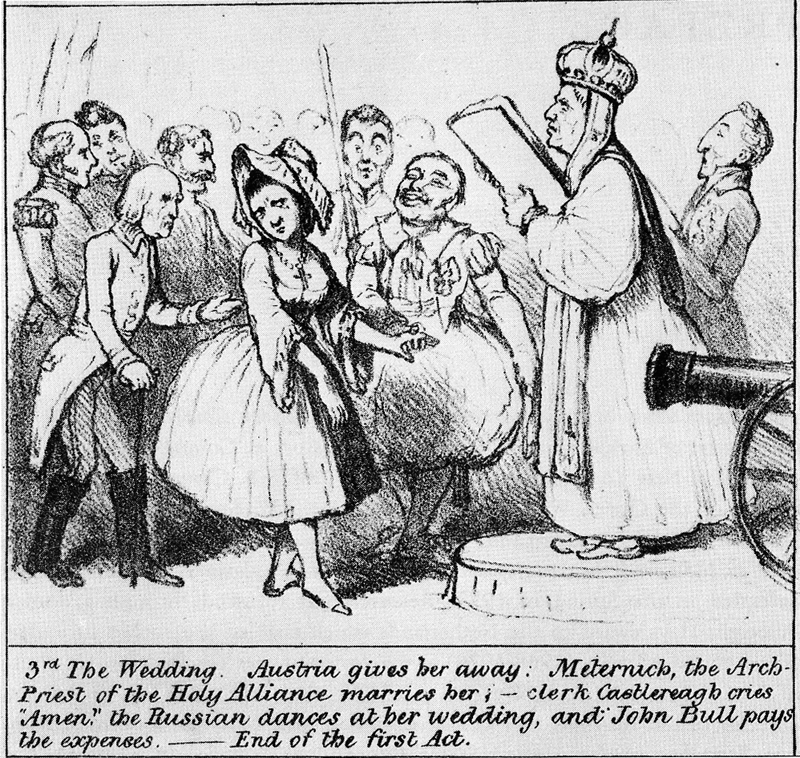
A British cartoon, satirising the "wedding" of Belgium and the Netherlands at the Congress of Vienna

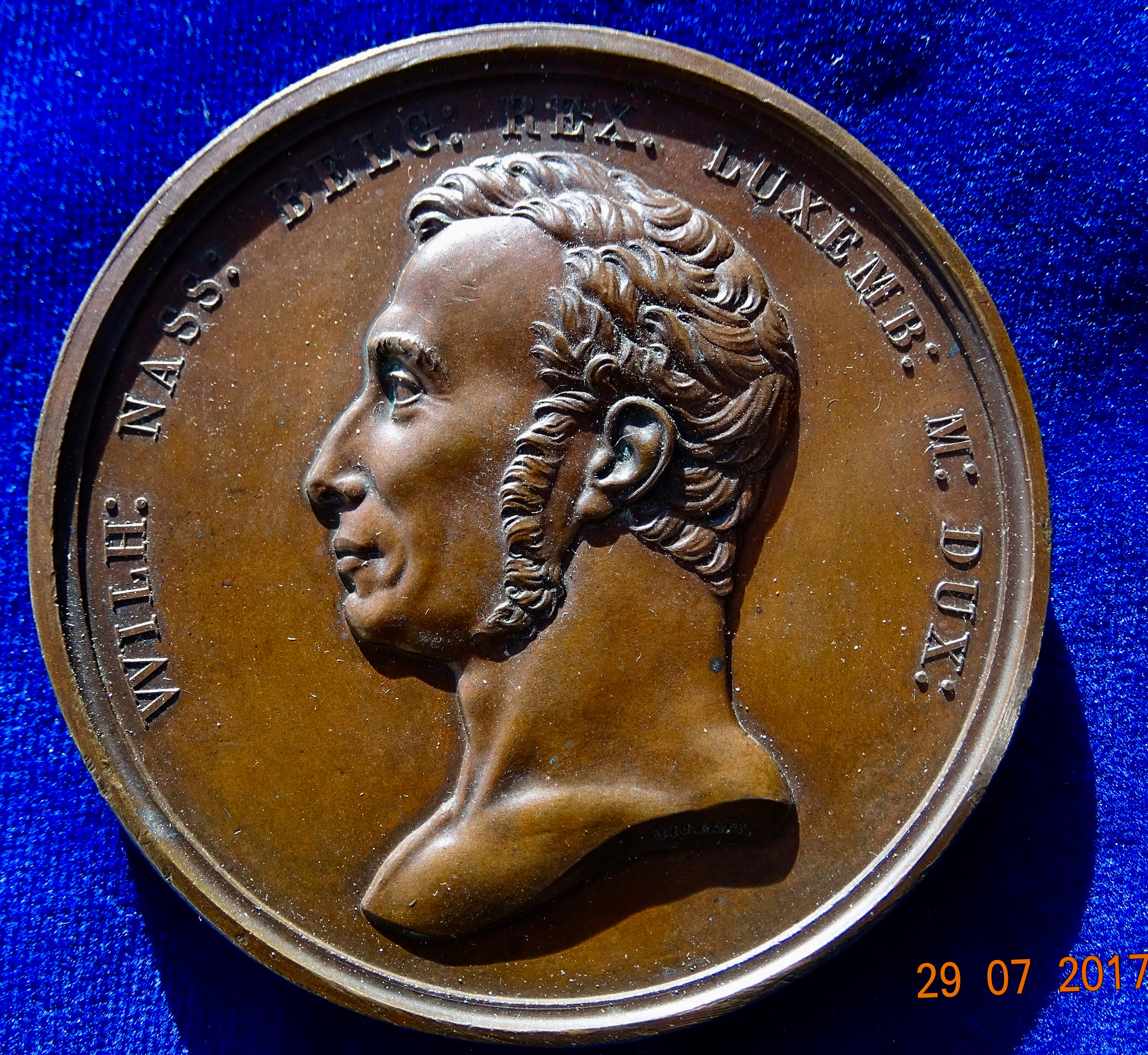
William I in March 1815 as King of the Belgians and Grand Duke of Luxembourg on a bronze medal by Michaut, obverse.

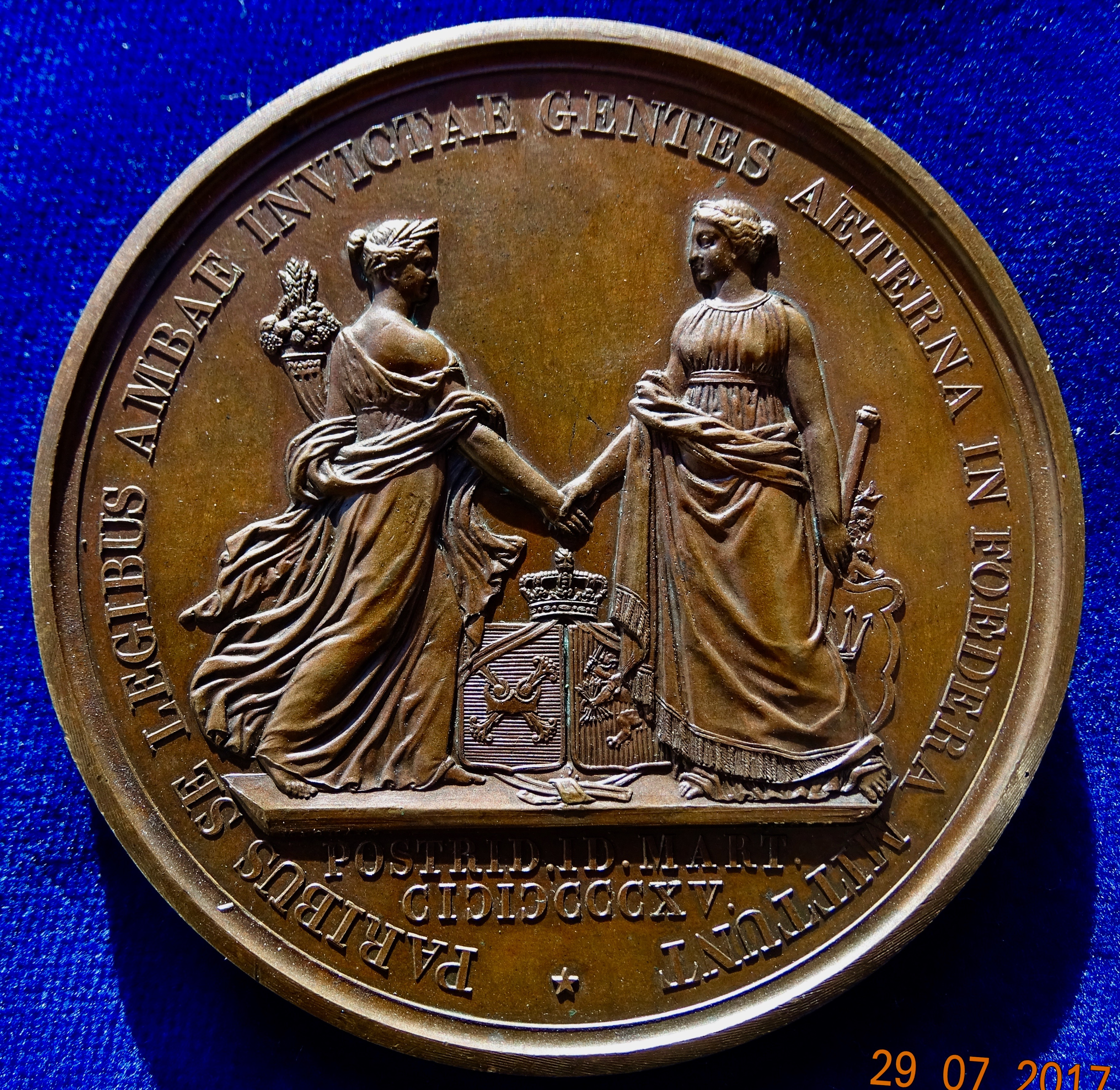
On the back of this medal commemorating the unification of the Low Countries: Belgium and the Netherlands shake hands.

== Government ==
=== Constitution and government ===
Though the United Netherlands was a constitutional monarchy, the king retained significant control as head of state and head of government. Beneath the king was a bicameral legislature known as the States General with a Senate and House of Representatives.

From the start, the administrative system proved controversial. Representation in the seat House of Representatives, for example, was divided equally between south and north, although the former had a larger population. This was resented in the south, which believed that the government was dominated by northerners. Additionally, the king had somewhat greater power than is the case for Dutch and Belgian monarchs. The ministers were responsible to him.

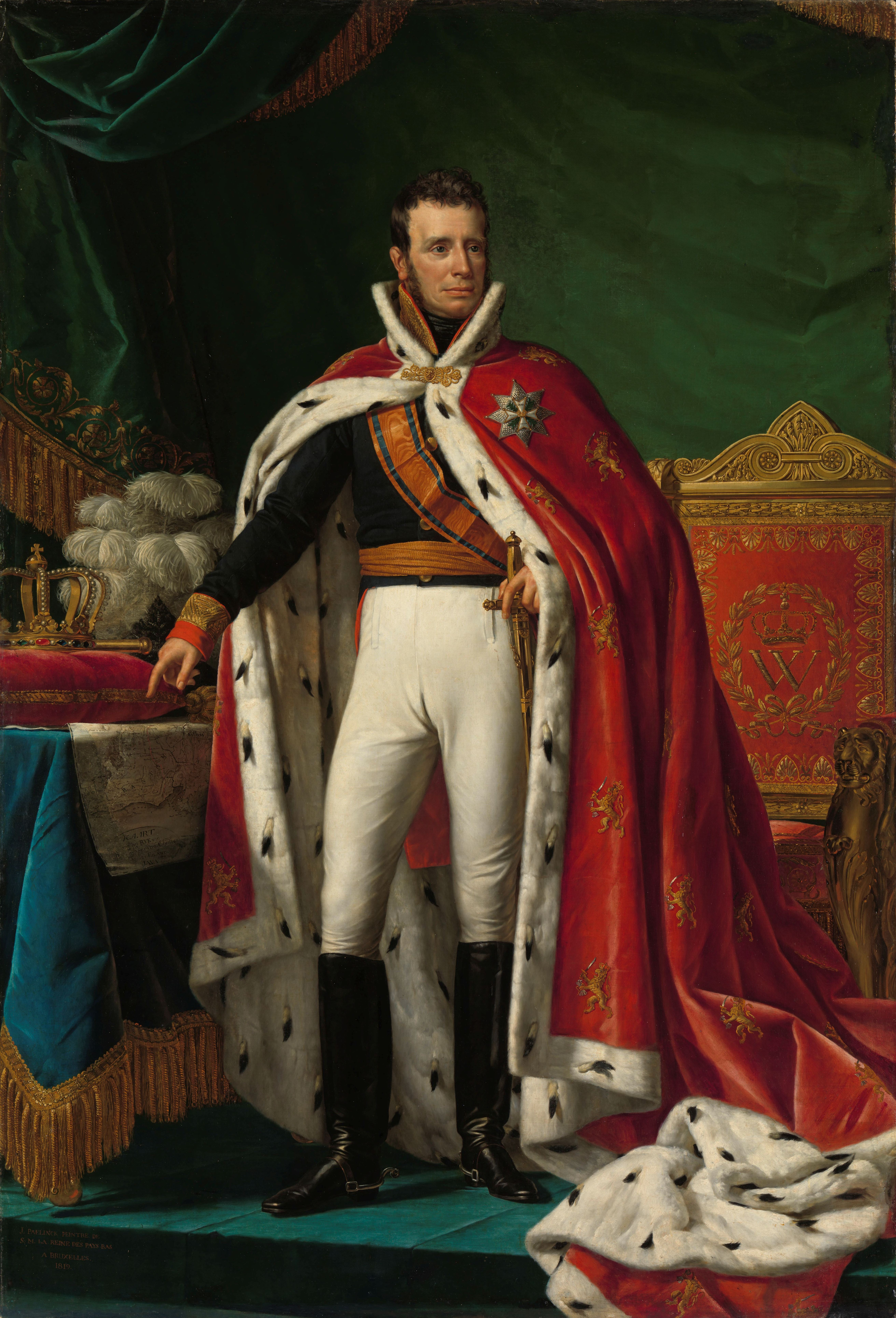
King William I

=== Provinces ===
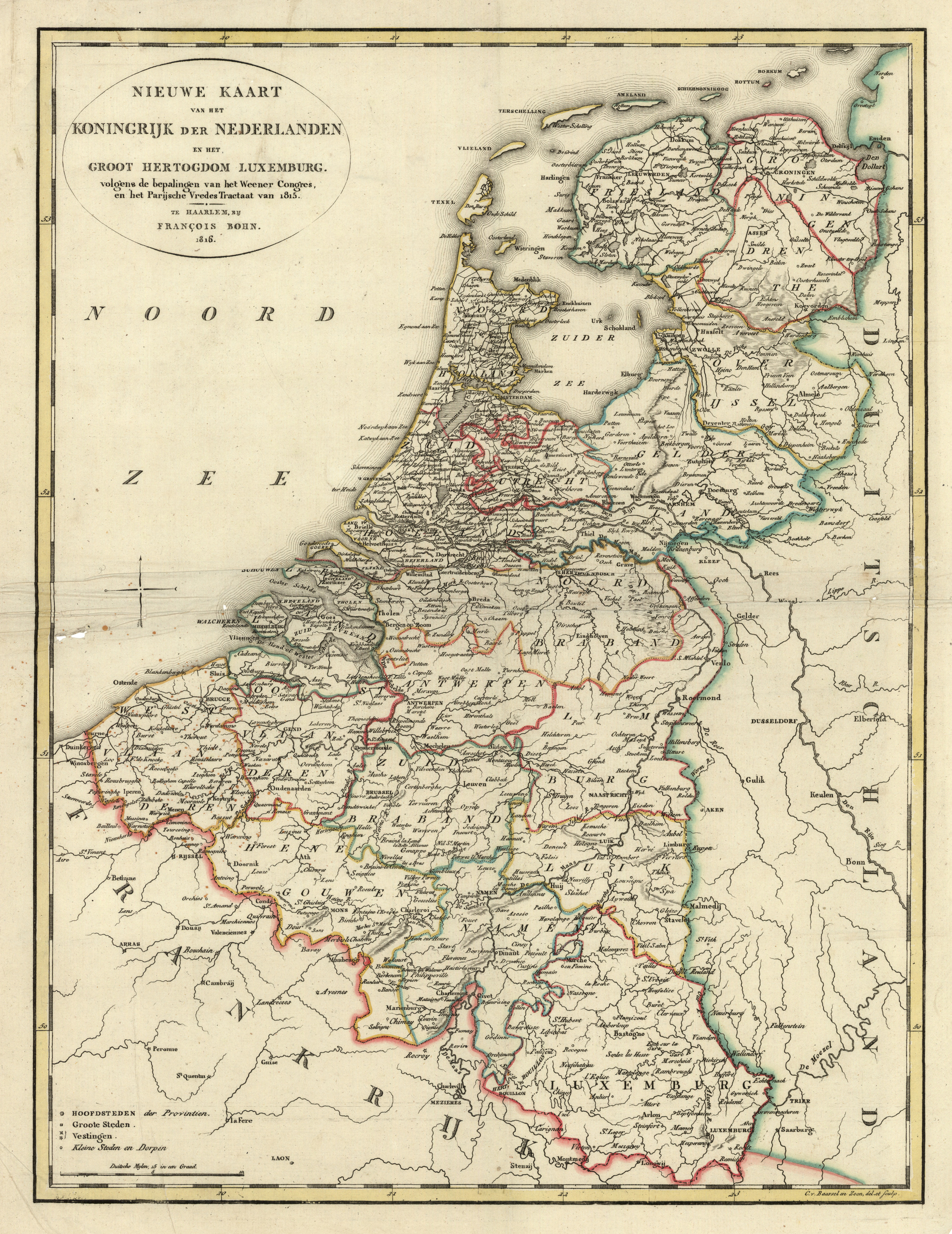
New Map of the United Kingdom of the Netherlands and Luxemburg, 1815

Map of the United Kingdom of the Netherlands

The United Netherlands was divided into 17 provinces and the Grand Duchy of Luxembourg which was constitutionally distinct. All of these provinces can trace their origin to a medieval lordship, county, duchy or bishopric, apart from Antwerp (previously part of Duchy of Brabant) and Limburg (previously part of Prince-Bishopric of Liège and Duchy of Gelderland). Their status changed when they came under French rule, when their administration was centralised, reducing their powers. They included:

Province	Emerged from the former Départements	Members in the House of Representatives	Presently part of	Notes
Central Brabant	Southern part of Deux-Nèthes (Dutch: Twee Neten)	5	Belgium	Later named to "Antwerp", after its capital.
Drenthe	Southern part of Ems-Occidental	1	Netherlands	
Frisia	Frise	5	Netherlands	
Guelders	Yssel-Supérieur	6	Netherlands	Excludes the city of Guelders itself.
Groningen	Northern part of Ems-Occidental	4	Netherlands	
Hainaut	Jemmape	8	Belgium	
Holland	Bouches-de-la-Meuse and the western part of the Zuyderzée	22	Netherlands	Divided into North Holland and South Holland in 1840.
Limburg	Meuse-Inférieure	4	Belgium, Netherlands	Excludes the city of Limburg itself, which is in Liège instead. From 1839 onwards divided into the Belgian province of Limburg and the Duchy of Limburg, which became the Dutch province of Limburg in 1866.
Liège	Largest part of Ourthe	6	Belgium	
Namur	Western part of Sambre-et-Meuse, part of Ardennes	2	Belgium	
North Brabant	Bouches-du-Rhin, northern part of Deux-Nèthes, eastern part of Bouches-de-l'Escaut	7	Netherlands	
East Flanders	Southern part of Escaut	10	Belgium	
Overyssel	Bouches-de-l'Yssel	4	Netherlands	
Zeeland	Western part of Bouches-de-l'Escaut and the northern part of Escaut	3	Netherlands	
South Brabant	Dyle	8	Belgium	Renamed simply the Province of Brabant in 1831. Divided into the provinces of Flemish Brabant, Walloon Brabant and the Brussels Capital Region in 1995.
Utrecht	Southeastern part of Zuyderzée	3	Netherlands	
West Flanders	Lys	8	Belgium	

The United Netherlands was also a colonial power with overseas colonies in the East Indies and elsewhere:

- Curaçao and Dependencies
- East Indies
  - Malacca (handed to the British in 1825, per the 1824 Treaty of London)
- Gold Coast
- Sint Eustatius and Dependencies (merged with Curaçao and Dependencies in 1828)
- Surat (handed to the British in 1825, per the 1824 Treaty of London)
- Surinam

== Economic policy ==
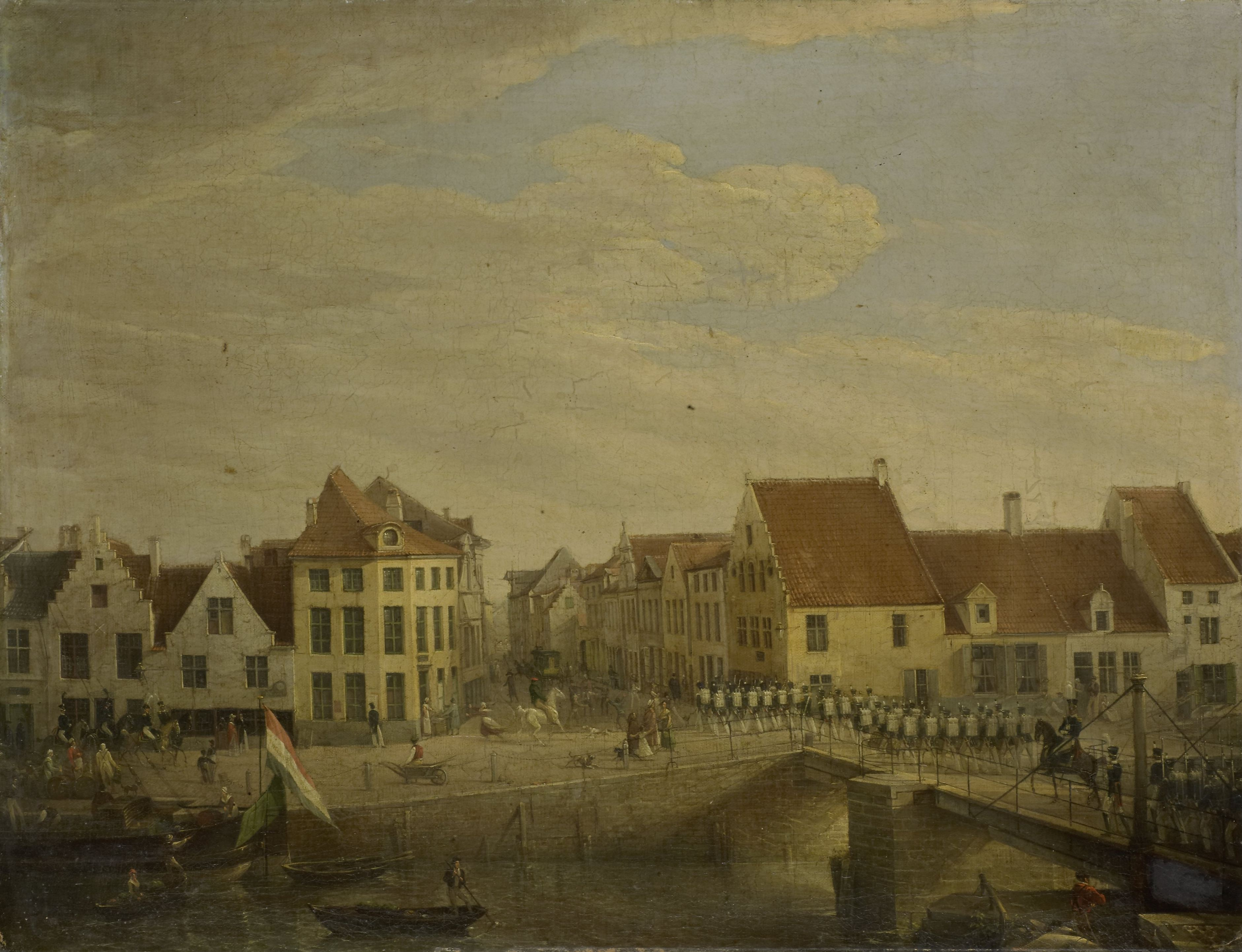
Dutch troops in the Flemish city of Dendermonde in 1820

Economically, the United Netherlands prospered. Supported by the state, the Industrial Revolution began to affect the Southern Netherlands where a number of modern industries emerged, encouraged by figures such as John Cockerill who created the steel industry in Wallonia. Antwerp emerged as major trading port.

William I actively supported economic modernisation. Modern universities were established in Leuven, in Liège, and in Ghent in 1817. Lower education was also extended. The General Netherlands Society for Advancing National Industry (Algemeene Nederlandsche Maatschappij ter Begunstiging van de Volksvlijt) was created in 1822 to encourage industrialisation in the south, while the Netherlands Trading Society (Nederlandsche Handel-Maatschappij) was created in 1825 to encourage trade with the colonies. William I also embarked on a program of canal building that saw the creation of the North Holland, Ghent–Terneuzen and Brussels–Charleroi canals.

== Language policy ==
Willem I felt that one nation must have one language and began a policy of Dutchification in politics and education. In the southern provinces of Antwerp, East-, West-Flanders, Limburg (1819), and the bilingual South Brabant (1823), Dutch was made the sole official language. While in the Walloon provinces of Hainaut, Liège, Namur, French was maintained as official language but Dutch was gradually introduced into education. However, French was still used to some degree in administration in both North and South. In the Grand Duchy of Luxembourg, French was the de facto official language while German was used in education.

== Regional tensions ==
Differences between Southern and Northern Netherlands were never totally resolved. The two were divided by the issue of religion because the south was strongly Roman Catholic and the north largely Dutch Reformed. The Catholic Church in Belgium resented the state's encroachment on its traditional privileges, especially in education. In French-speaking parts of the south, attempts to enforce the use of Dutch language were particularly resented among the elite. Many Belgians believed that the United Netherlands' constitution discriminated against them. Though they represented 62 percent of the population, they were only allocated 50 percent of the seats in the House and less in the Senate while the state extracted money from the richer south to subsidise the north. By the mid-1820s, a union of opposition had formed in Belgium, uniting liberals and Catholic conservatives against Dutch rule.

=== Belgian Revolution and secession ===
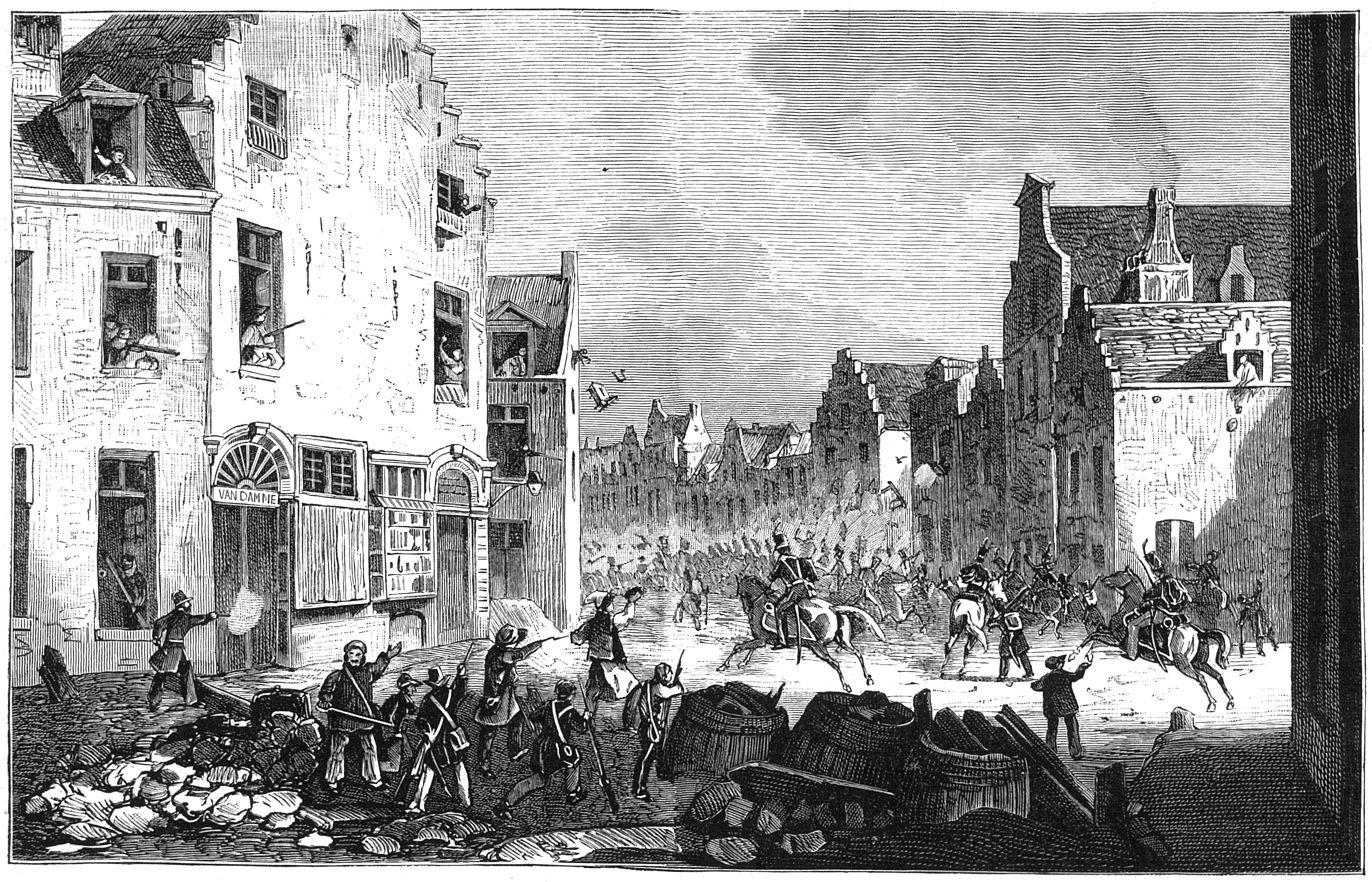
Fighting between Belgian rebels and the Dutch military expedition in Brussels in September 1830

The Belgian Revolution broke out on 25 August 1830, inspired by the recent July Revolution in France. A military intervention in September failed to defeat the rebels in Brussels, radicalising the movement. Belgium was declared an independent state on 4 October 1830. A constitutional monarchy was established under King Leopold I.

William I refused to accept the secession of Belgium. In August 1831, he launched the Ten Days' Campaign, a major military offensive into Belgium. Though initially successful, the French intervened to support the Belgians and the invasion had to be abandoned. After a period of tension, a settlement was agreed at the Treaty of London in 1839. The Dutch recognised Belgian independence, in exchange for territorial concessions. The frontier between the two countries was finally fixed by the Treaty of Maastricht in 1843. Luxembourg became an autonomous state in personal union with the Dutch, though ceding some territory to Belgium.

== See also ==
- Belgium–Netherlands relations
- Benelux Union
- Orangism (Belgium)
