= Apennins =

Department of the First French Empire (1805-1815)

Coordinates: 44.32°N 9.32°E

Department of the Appenins Département des Apennins
- department of the First French Empire
- 1805–1815
- Location of Apennins in France (1812)
- Capital: Chiavari
- Area
  - 1812: 4,160 km^{2} (1,610 sq mi)
- Population
  - 1812: 213,465
- History
  - Annexation of the Ligurian Republic: 4 June 1805
  - Congress of Vienna: 1815
- Political subdivisions: 3 arrondissements
Preceded by	Succeeded by
Ligurian Republic	Kingdom of Sardinia
- Today part of: Italy

Apennins (French pronunciation: [apɛnɛ̃]) was a department of the First French Empire of 1805-1814 in present-day Italy. Named after the Apennine Mountains, it originated on 6 June 1805, after France had directly annexed the Ligurian Republic (formerly the Republic of Genoa) on 4 June 1805. Its capital was Chiavari.

Disbanded after the defeat of Napoleon in 1814, the Congress of Vienna awarded the old territory of Genoa to the Kingdom of Sardinia (December 1814). The area of the former département forms parts of the Italian provinces of Genoa, La Spezia, Massa-Carrara and Parma.

== Subdivisions ==
Coat of arms of Chiavari under the French Empire

The department was subdivided into the following arrondissements and cantons (situation in 1812):

- Chiavari, cantons: Chiavari, Borzonasca, Lavagna, Moconesi, Rapallo, Santo Stefano d'Aveto, Sestri Levante and Varese Ligure.
- Pontremoli, cantons: Pontremoli, Bagnone, Berceto, Borgo Val di Taro, Compiano, Filattiera, Groppoli and Terrarossa.
- Sarzana, cantons: Sarzana, Albiano, Calice al Cornoviglio, Fivizzano, Sesta Godano, La Spezia, Lerici, Levanto and Vezzano Ligure.

Its population in 1812 was 213,465, and its area was 416,000 hectares.
