= Liamone =

Former French department (1793–1811)

Coordinates: 41.93°N 8.73°E

Departments of the French Empire in 1811, including Liamone on the island of Corsica.

Liamone was a department of the French island of Corsica between 1793 and 1811. It was located in the southern and western parts of the island, and its capital was Ajaccio.

Liamone was created in 1793 by the division of the former department of Corse, which covered the whole island. Corse was reconstituted in 1811 when Liamone and Golo were recombined into a single department.

Until 1976, Corsica was only divided into one department. Corsica was split into two departments in 1976: Corse-du-Sud and Haute-Corse.

== Deportees ==
In 1805, the Prefect of Liamone, Arrigi, reported that 127 people of color from Guadeloupe and Saint-Domingue had been sent to build bridges and roads, and work as domestic servants. in those years, deportees to dépôts at Liamone and Golo on Corsica were poorly fed. By 1808, the Prefect reported that only 24 of these workers were left, and that half of them were "too ill to work" due to their poor subsistence.

== See also ==
- Former departments of France
