= Golo (department) =

Coordinates: 42.69°N 9.43°E

Departments of the French Empire in 1811, including Golo on the island of Corsica.

Golo was a department of France from 1793 to 1811. It was located in the northern and eastern parts of the island of Corsica. The capital was Bastia. The department was named after the river Golo.

Golo and Liamone were created in 1793 by the division of the former department of Corse, which covered the whole island. It was abolished in 1811, when Ajaccio became capital of the department of Corsica.

Until 1976, Corsica was only divided into one department. Corsica was split into two departments in 1976: Corse-du-Sud and Haute-Corse.

== See also ==
- Former departments of France
