= Frise (department) =

Former French department (1811–1814)

Coordinates: 53.0333°N 6.31667°E

Location of Frise in France (1812)

Frise within the northern French Empire (1811)

Frise (French: [fʁiz]) was a department of the First French Empire in the present-day Netherlands. It was formed in 1811, after the Kingdom of Holland was annexed by France. It was named after Friesland: "Frise" [fʁiz] in French. It was the successor of the Friesland Department, which was formed in 1802. Its territory roughly corresponded with the present-day Dutch province of Friesland.

Its capital was Leeuwarden. The department was subdivided into the following arrondissements and cantons (situation in 1812):

- Leeuwarden, cantons: Bergum, Buitenpost, Dokkum, Dronrijp, Franeker, Hallum, Harlingen, Holwerd and Leeuwarden (2 cantons).
- Heerenveen, cantons: Akkrum, Beetsterzwaag, Heerenveen and Oldeberkoop.
- Sneek, cantons: Bolsward, Hindeloopen, Lemmer, Rauwerd and Sneek.

Its population in 1812 was 175,400, and its area was 279,835 hectares.

After Napoleon was defeated in 1813, the department became part of the United Kingdom of the Netherlands.
