= Ems-Oriental =

Former French department (1811–1814)

Coordinates: 53.4667°N 7.48333°E

Location of Ems-Oriental in France (1812)

Ems-Oriental (French: [ɛms ɔ.ʁjɑ̃.tal], "Eastern Ems"; Dutch: Ooster-Eems, German: Ost-Ems) was a department of the First French Empire in present-day Germany. It was formed in 1810, when the Kingdom of Holland was annexed by France. Its territory is part of the present-day German region of East Frisia in Lower Saxony. Its capital was Aurich. The department was subdivided into the following arrondissements and cantons (situation in 1812):

- Aurich, cantons: Aurich, Berum, Norden and Timmel.
- Emden, cantons: Emden, Leer, Oldersum, Pewsum and Stickhausen.
- Jever, cantons: Esens, Hooksiel, Jever, Rüstringen and Wittmund.

Its population in 1812 was 128,200.

After Napoleon was defeated in 1814, the department became part of the Kingdom of Hanover.
