= Bouches-de-la-Meuse =

Former French department (1811–1814)

Coordinates: 52.08°N 4.31°E

Location of Bouches-de-la-Meuse in France (1812)

Bouches-de-la-Meuse (French: [buʃ.də.la.møz], "Mouths of the Meuse"; Walloon: Bokes do Moûze, Dutch: Monden van de Maas) was a department of the First French Empire in the present-day Netherlands. It was named after the mouth of the river Meuse. It was formed in 1810, when the Kingdom of Holland was annexed by France. Its territory corresponded more or less with the present-day Dutch province of South Holland. Its capital was The Hague.

The department was subdivided into the following arrondissements and cantons (situation in 1813):

- The Hague, cantons: Alphen aan den Rijn, Katwijk, The Hague (4 cantons) and Voorburg.
- Brielle, cantons: Brielle, Goedereede, Sommelsdijk.
- Dordrecht, cantons: Dordrecht (2 cantons), Oud-Beijerland, Ridderkerk and Strijen.
- Gorinchem, cantons: Culemborg, Gorinchem and Sliedrecht.
- Leiden, cantons: Leiden (3 cantons), Noordwijk and Woubrugge.
- Rotterdam, cantons: Delft (2 cantons), Gouda, Haastrecht, Hillegersberg, Naaldwijk, Rotterdam (4 cantons), Schiedam and Vlaardingen.

Its population in 1812 was 393,600, and its area was 378,282 hectares.

After Napoleon was defeated in 1814, the department became part of the United Kingdom of the Netherlands.
