= Bouches-de-l'Escaut =

Former French department (1810–1814)

Coordinates: 51.4833°N 3.6°E

Location of Bouches-de-l'Escaut in France, 1812

Bouches-de-l'Escaut (French: [buʃ.də.lɛ.sko], "Mouths of the Scheldt"; Dutch: Monden van de Schelde) was a department of the First French Empire in the present-day Netherlands. It was formed in 1810, when the Kingdom of Holland was annexed by France. Its territory corresponded with the present-day Dutch province of Zeeland, minus Zeelandic Flanders, which was part of the department of Escaut. Its capital was Middelburg.

The department was subdivided into the following arrondissements and cantons (situation in 1812):

- Middelburg, cantons: Middelburg, Veere and Vlissingen.
- Goes, cantons: Goes, Heinkenszand, Kortgene and Kruiningen.
- Zierikzee, cantons: Zierikzee, Brouwershaven and Tholen.

Its population in 1812 was 76,820, and its area was 63,000 hectares.

After Napoleon was defeated in 1814, the department became part of the United Kingdom of the Netherlands.
