= Zuyderzée =

Former French department (1811–1814)

Coordinates: 52.3667°N 4.9°E

Location of Zuyderzée in France (1812)

Zuyderzée within the northern French Empire (1811)

Zuyderzée (French: [zɥi.dɛʁ.ze], "Southern Sea", Dutch: Zuyderzee) was a department of the First French Empire in the present-day Netherlands. It was named after the Zuiderzee sea inlet. It was formed in 1810, when the Kingdom of Holland was annexed by France. Its territory corresponded more or less with the present-day Dutch provinces of North Holland and Utrecht. Its capital was Amsterdam.

The department was subdivided into the following arrondissements and cantons (situation in 1812):

- Amsterdam, cantons: Amsterdam (6 cantons), Baambrugge, Kudelstaart, Loenen, Naarden, Nieuwer-Amstel, Oud-Loosdrecht, Watergraafsmeer and Weesp.
- Alkmaar, cantons: Alkmaar (2 cantons), De Rijp, Schagen, Texel, Wieringen and Zijpe.
- Amersfoort, cantons: Amersfoort (2 cantons), Rhenen and Wijk bij Duurstede.
- Haarlem, cantons: Beverwijk, Bloemendaal, Haarlem (2 cantons), Heemstede, Oostzaandam, Westzaan and Westzaandam.
- Hoorn, cantons: Enkhuizen, Grootebroek-Edam- Purmerend, Hoorn (2 cantons), Medemblik and Monnickendam.
- Utrecht, cantons: IJsselstein, Maarssen, Mijdrecht, Schoonhoven, Utrecht (2 cantons) and Woerden.

Its population in 1812 was 507,500, and its area was 950,100 hectares.

After Napoleon was defeated in 1814, the department became part of the United Kingdom of the Netherlands.
