= Bouches-du-Rhin =

Former French department (1810–1814)

Coordinates: 51.6833°N 5.3°E

Location of Bouches-du-Rhin in France (1812)

Bouches-du-Rhin (French: [buʃ.dy.ʁɛ̃]; "Mouths of the Rhine", Dutch: Monden van de Rijn) was a department of the First French Empire in the present-day Netherlands. It was named after the mouth of the river Rhine. It was formed in 1810, when the Kingdom of Holland was annexed by France. Its territory corresponded with the eastern half of the present-day Dutch province of North Brabant and a part of the province of Gelderland. Its capital was 's-Hertogenbosch.

The department was subdivided into the following arrondissements and cantons (situation in 1812):

- 's-Hertogenbosch, cantons: 's-Hertogenbosch, Boxtel, Heusden, Oisterwijk, Oss, Tilburg, Waalwijk and Zaltbommel.
- Eindhoven, cantons: Asten, Eindhoven, Gemert, Helmond, Hilvarenbeek, Oirschot and Sint-Oedenrode.
- Nijmegen, cantons: Boxmeer, Druten, Grave, Nijmegen, Ravenstein and Wijchen.

Its population in 1812 was 257,580.

After Napoleon was defeated in 1814, the department became part of the United Kingdom of the Netherlands.
