= Departments of France =

Administrative subdivision in France

Departments of France Départements français (French)
- Location: France
- Found in: Regions
- Number: 101 (not including the Metropolis of Lyon) (as of January 2021)
- Possible types: Metropolitan departments; Overseas departments
- Populations: Largest: Nord, Hauts-de-France—2,613,000 (2022 census); Smallest: Lozère, Occitanie—83,000 (2022 census)
- Areas: Largest: French Guiana—83,533.9 km^{2} (32,252.6 sq mi); Smallest: Paris, Île-de-France—105.4 km^{2} (40.7 sq mi)
- Densities: Largest: Paris, Île-de-France—20,755/km^{2} (53,760/sq mi); Smallest: French Guiana—3.5/km^{2} (9.1/sq mi)
- Government: Departmental council
- Subdivisions: Arrondissements; Cantons; Communes

In the administrative divisions of France, the department (French: département, pronounced [depaʁtəmɑ̃]) is one of the three levels of government under the national level ("territorial collectivities"), between the administrative regions and the communes. There are a total of 101 departments, consisting of ninety-six departments in metropolitan France, and five overseas departments (which are also classified as overseas regions). Departments are further subdivided into 333 arrondissements and 2,054 cantons (as of 2023). These last two levels of government have no political autonomy, instead serving as the administrative basis for the local organisation of police, fire departments, and, in certain cases, elections.

Each department is administered by an elected body called a departmental council (sing. conseil départemental, pl. conseils départementaux). From 1800 to April 2015, these were called general councils (sing. conseil général, pl. conseils généraux). Each council has a president. Their main areas of responsibility include the management of a number of social and welfare allowances, of junior high school (collège) buildings and technical staff, and local roads and school and rural buses, and a contribution to municipal infrastructures. Local services of the state administration are traditionally organised at departmental level, where the prefect represents the government; however, regions have gained importance since the 2000s, with some department-level services merged into region-level services.

The departments were created in 1790 as a rational replacement of Ancien Régime provinces with a view to strengthen national unity; the title "department" is used to mean a part of a larger whole. Almost all of them were named after physical geographical features (rivers, mountains, or coasts), rather than after historical or cultural territories, which could have their own loyalties, or after their own administrative seats. The division of France into departments was a project particularly identified with the French revolutionary leader the Abbé Sieyès, although it had already been frequently discussed and written about by many politicians and thinkers. The earliest known suggestion of it is from 1665 in the writings of d'Argenson. They have inspired similar divisions in many countries, some of them former French colonies. The 1822 territorial division of Spain (reverted due to the 1823 French intervention ending the trienio liberal) and the 1833 territorial division of Spain, which forms the basis of the present day provinces of Spain with minor modifications, are also based on the French model of departments of roughly equal size.

Most French departments are assigned a two-digit number, the Official Geographical Code, allocated by the Institut national de la statistique et des études économiques (Insée). Overseas departments have a three-digit number. The number is used, for example, in the postal code and was, until the introduction of the SIV scheme in 2009, part of the vehicle registration plate number. Residents commonly use the numbers to refer to their own department or a neighbouring one, for example inhabitants of Loiret may refer to their department as "the 45". More distant departments are generally referred to by their names, as few people know the numbers of all the departments.

In 2014, President François Hollande proposed abolishing departmental councils by 2020, which would have maintained the departments as administrative divisions, and transferring their powers to other levels of governance. This reform project has since been scrapped.

== History ==
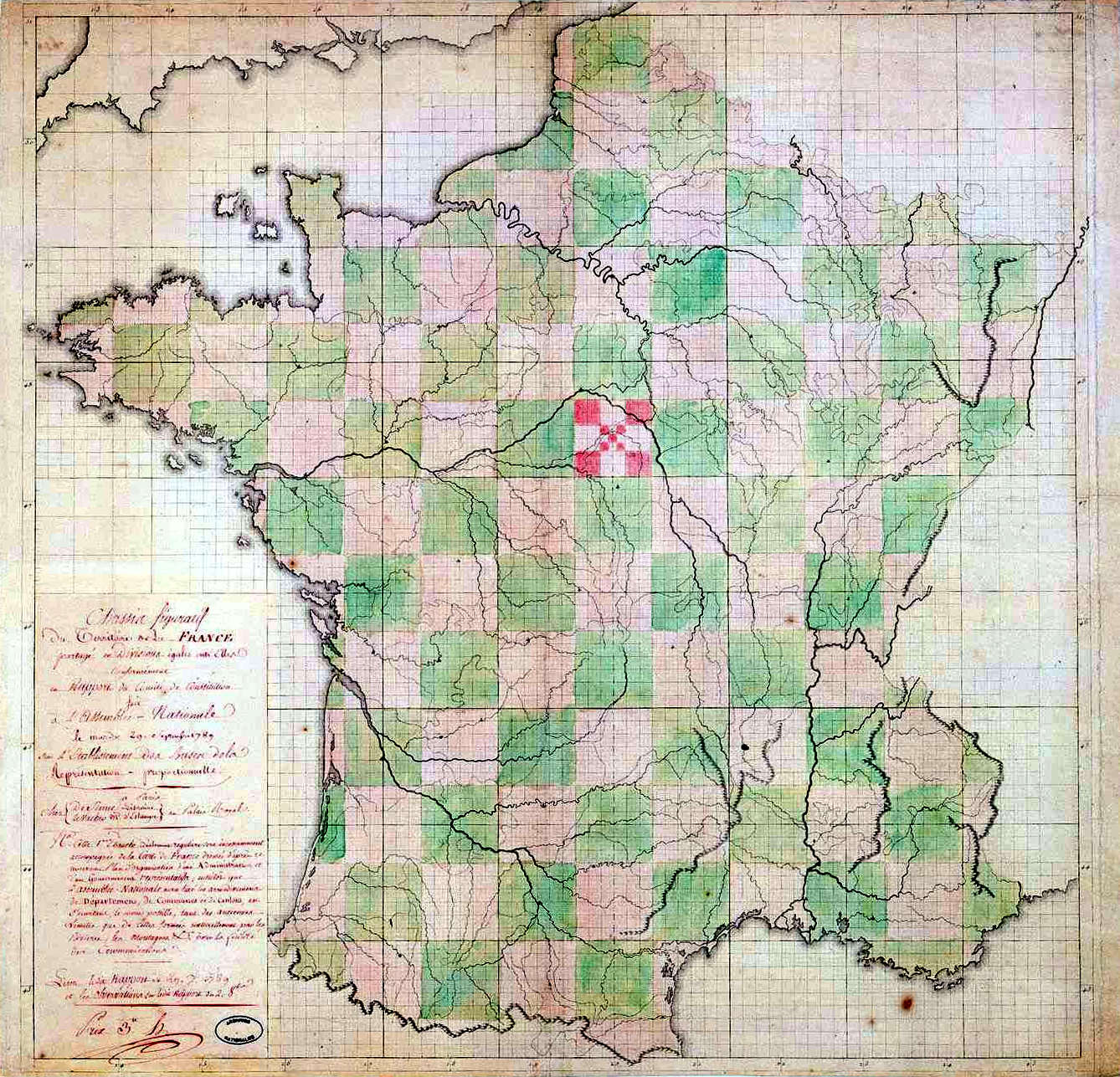
Geometrical proposition rejected

French provinces before 1790 (color) and today's departments (black borders)

The first French territorial departments were proposed in 1665 by Marc-René d'Argenson to serve as administrative areas purely for the Ponts et Chaussées (Bridges and Highways) infrastructure administration.

Before the French Revolution, France gained territory gradually through the annexation of a mosaic of independent entities. By the end of the Ancien Régime it was organised into provinces. During the Revolution they were dissolved, partly in order to weaken old loyalties. The National Constituent Assembly decided to create a more uniform division into departments (département) and districts in late 1789. The process began on 4 August 1789 with the elimination of provincial privileges, and a 22 December 1789 decree (with letters patent in January 1790) provided for the termination of the provincial governments.

The modern department system, as all-purpose units of the government, was decreed on 26 February 1790 (with letters patent on 4 March 1790) by the National Constituent Assembly. Their boundaries served two purposes:

- Boundaries were chosen to break up France's historical regions in an attempt to erase cultural differences and build a more homogeneous nation.
- Boundaries were set so that every settlement in the country was within a day's ride of the capital of a department. This was a security measure, intended to keep the entire national territory under close control.

Departments at the maximum extent of the First French Empire (1812)

The old nomenclature was carefully avoided in naming the new departments. Most were named after an area's principal river or other physical features. Even Paris was in the department of Seine. Savoy, during its temporary occupation, became the department of Mont-Blanc. The provinces continued to exist administratively until 21 September 1791.

The number of departments, initially 83, had been increased to 130 by 1809 with the territorial gains of the Republic and of the First French Empire. Following the defeats of Napoleon in 1814–1815 the Congress of Vienna returned France to its pre-war size and the number of departments was reduced to 86 (three of the original departments having been split). In 1860 France acquired the County of Nice and Savoy, which led to the creation of three new departments. Two were added from the new Savoyard territory, while the department of Alpes-Maritimes was created from Nice and a portion of the Var department. The 89 departments were given numbers based on the alphabetical order of their names.

The department of Bas-Rhin and parts of Meurthe, Moselle, Vosges and Haut-Rhin were ceded to the German Empire in 1871 following France's defeat in the Franco-Prussian War. A small part of Haut-Rhin, however, remained French and became known as the Territoire de Belfort; the remaining parts of Meurthe and Moselle were merged into a new Meurthe-et-Moselle department. When France regained the ceded departments after World War I, the Territoire de Belfort was not reintegrated into Haut-Rhin. In 1922 it became France's 90th department. Likewise the Lorraine departments were not changed back to their original boundaries, and a new Moselle department was created in the regained territory, with slightly different boundaries from the pre-war department of the same name.

In 1946, French Guiana, Guadeloupe, Martinique and Réunion became overseas departments. The reorganisation of Île-de-France in 1968 and the division of Corsica in 1975 added six more departments, raising the total in Metropolitan France to 96. By 2011, when the overseas collectivity of Mayotte became a department, joining the existing overseas departments of the Republic and bringing the total number of departments in the French Republic to 101. In 2015 the Urban Community of Lyon was split from Rhône to form the Métropole de Lyon, a sui generis entity, with the powers of both an intercommunality and those of a department on its territory, formally classified as a "territorial collectivity with particular status" (French: collectivité territoriale à statut particulier) and as such not belonging to any department. As of 2019 Corse-du-Sud and Haute-Corse are still administrative departments, although they no longer have the status of departmental "territorial collectivities": region and department functions have been managed by a "single territorial collectivity" since 2018.

Despite the intention to avoid the old nomenclature, often the names of pre-1790 provinces remained in use. For example, the name of Berry, though no longer having an official status, remains in widespread use in daily life.

== General characteristics ==
=== Government and administration ===
Administrative divisions of France

The departmental seat of government is known as the prefecture (préfecture) or chef-lieu de département and is generally a town of some importance roughly at the geographical centre of the department. This was determined according to the time taken to travel on horseback from the periphery of the department. The goal was for the prefecture to be accessible on horseback from any town in the department within 24 hours. The prefecture is not necessarily the largest city in the department: for instance, in Saône-et-Loire department the capital is Mâcon, but the largest city is Chalon-sur-Saône. Departments may be divided into arrondissements. The capital of an arrondissement is called a subprefecture (sous-préfecture) or chef-lieu d'arrondissement.

Each department is administered by a departmental council (conseil départemental), an assembly elected for six years by universal suffrage, with the President of the Departmental Council as executive of the department. Before 1982, the chief executive of the department was the prefect (préfet), who represents the Government of France in each department and is appointed by the President of the French Republic. The prefect is assisted by one or more sub-prefects (sous-préfet) based in the subprefectures of the department. Since 1982, the prefect retains only the powers that are not delegated to the department councils. In practice, their role has been largely limited to preventing local policy from conflicting with national policy.

The departments are further divided into communes, governed by municipal councils. As of 2025, there were 34,746 communes in France. In the overseas territories, some communes play a role at departmental level. Paris, the country's capital city, is a commune as well as a department.

Population density in the departments (2007). The broken lines mark the approximate boundaries of the empty diagonal. The solid line is the Le Havre-Marseille line, to the east of which lives 60% of the French population.

In mainland France (metropolitan France, excluding Corsica), the median land area of a department is 5,965 km^{2} (2,303 sq mi), which is two-and-a-half times the median land area of the ceremonial counties of England and the preserved counties of Wales and slightly more than three-and-half times the median land area of a county of the United States. At the 2001 census, the median population of a department in continental France was 511,000 inhabitants, which is 21 times the median population of a United States county, but less than two-thirds of the median population of a ceremonial county of England and Wales. Most of the departments have an area of between 4,000 and 8,000 km^{2} (1500 to 3000 sq. mi), and a population between 320,000 and 1 million. The largest in area is Gironde (10,000 km^{2} (3,900 sq mi)), while the smallest is the city of Paris (105 km^{2} (41 sq mi)). The most populous is Nord (2,550,000) and the least populous is Lozère (74,000).

=== Numbering ===
The departments are numbered. Their two-digit numbers appear in postal codes, in INSEE codes (including the social security assigned at birth to all French citizens) and on vehicle registration plates. As a result, they are in every use at least locally, and some of them are quite famous; for example, Seine-Saint-Denis is nicknamed “93” or “9-3”.

The numbers are in alphabetical order of the names of the departments, with some alterations:

- When the name is formed by an adjective followed by a noun, the order is determined by the noun, which groups together those with the same river or mountain in their name: for example, Bas-Rhin and Haut-Rhin (“Lower Rhine” and “Upper Rhine”) are ordered as “Rhin (Bas-)” and “Rhin (Haut-)”, at the letter R rather than B and H, and are numbered 67 and 68. This also concerns Hautes-Alpes, Haute-Garonne, Haute-Loire, Haute-Marne, Hautes-Pyrénées, Haute-Vienne and Deux-Sèvres, and formerly Alpes-de-Haute-Provence and Pyrénées-Atlantiques.
- Several departments changed name and some have been divided, so the correspondence became less exact. Alphanumeric codes 2A and 2B were given to Corse-du-Sud and Haute-Corse when Corsica (20) was split; Corsica received the number 20R when a single authority was created for the two departments. Paris, which has a double statuts as a commune and a department, is numbered 75, inherited from Seine.
- Some departments were placed at the end of the initial list of numbers. Territoire de Belfort, historically detached from Haut-Rhin, received number 90. Departments created later are numbered 91 to 96, and the five overseas departments and Saint-Pierre-et-Miquelon are numbered 971 to 976.

Together with the ISO 3166-1 alpha-2 country code FR, the numbers form the ISO 3166-2 country subdivision codes for the metropolitan departments.

The two-digit code "98" is used by Monaco.

=== Relation to national government ===
Originally, the relationship between the departments and the central government was left somewhat ambiguous. While citizens in each department elected their own officials, the local governments were subordinated to the central government, becoming instruments of national integration. By 1793, however, the revolutionary government had turned the departments into transmission belts for policies enacted in Paris. With few exceptions, the departments had this role until the early 1960s.

=== Political party preferences ===
These maps cannot be used as a useful resource of voter preferences, because Departmental Councils are elected on a two-round system, which drastically limits the chances of fringe parties, if they are not supported on one of the two rounds by a moderate party. After the 1992 election, the left had a majority in only 21 of the 100 departments; after the 2011 election, the left dominated 61 of the 100 departments. (Mayotte only became a department after the election.)

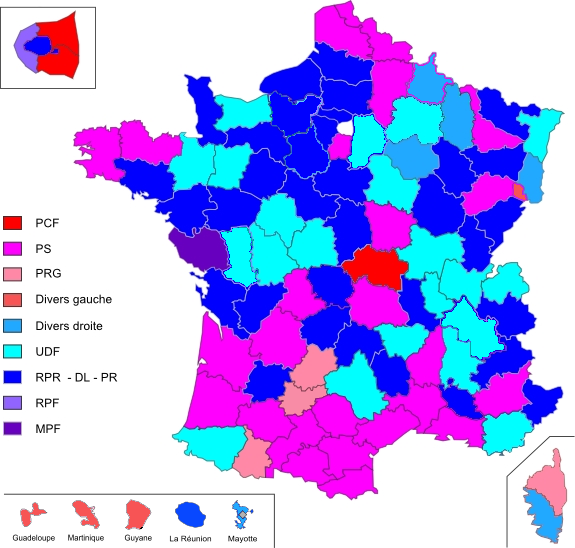
Party affiliation of the General Council Presidents of the various departments in the cantonal elections of 1998

Party affiliation of the General Council Presidents of the various departments in the elections of 2001

Party affiliation of the General Council Presidents of the various departments in the elections of 2004

Party affiliation of the General Council Presidents of the various departments in the elections of 2008

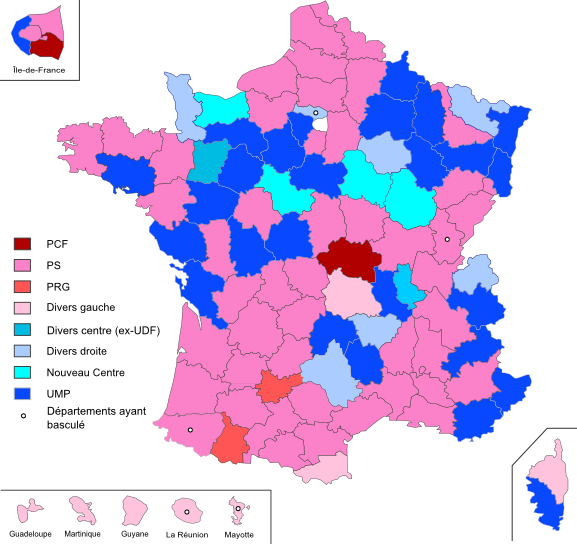
Party affiliation of the General Council Presidents of the various departments in the elections of 2011

Party affiliation of the General Council Presidents of the various departments in the elections of 2015

Key to the parties:

- Divers Centre = Independents of the centre or Democratic Movement (Mouvement démocrate)
- Divers Droite (DVD) = Independent conservatives
- Divers Gauche (DVG) = Independent left-wing politicians
- MPF = Movement for France (Mouvement pour la France) (right)
- Nouveau Centre = New Centre (centre or centre-right)
- PCF = French Communist Party (Parti communiste français)
- PRG = Radical Party of the Left (Parti radical de gauche)
- PS = Socialist Party (Parti socialiste)
- UDF = Union for French Democracy (Union pour la démocratie française) succeeded by Democratic Movement
- UMP = Union for a Popular Movement (Union pour un mouvement populaire)

== Future ==
The removal of one or more levels of local government has been discussed for some years; in particular, the option of removing the departmental level. Frédéric Lefebvre, spokesman for the UMP, said in December 2008 that the fusion of the departments with the regions was a matter to be dealt with soon. This was soon refuted by Édouard Balladur and Gérard Longuet, members of the committee for the reform of local authorities, known as the Balladur Committee.

In January 2008, the Attali Commission recommended that the departmental level of government should be eliminated within ten years.

Nevertheless, the Balladur Committee has not retained this proposition and does not advocate the disappearance of the departments, but simply "favors the voluntary grouping of departments", which it suggests also for the regions, with the aim of reducing the number of regions to 15. This committee advocates, on the contrary, the suppression of the cantons.

== Maps and tables ==
=== Current departments ===
Each department has a coat of arms and a flag with which it is commonly associated, though not all are officially recognised or used.

INSEE code	Arms ^{1}	Date of establishment	Department	Capital	Region	Named after
01	Coat of arms of department 01	26 February 1790	Ain	Bourg-en-Bresse	Auvergne-Rhône-Alpes	Ain (river)
02	Coat of arms of department 02	26 February 1790	Aisne	Laon	Hauts-de-France	Aisne (river)
03	Coat of arms of department 03	26 February 1790	Allier	Moulins	Auvergne-Rhône-Alpes	Allier (river)
04	Coat of arms of department 04	26 February 1790	Alpes-de-Haute-Provence ^{2}	Digne-les-Bains	Provence-Alpes-Côte d'Azur	Alps mountains and Provence region
05	Coat of arms of department 05	26 February 1790	Hautes-Alpes	Gap	Provence-Alpes-Côte d'Azur	Alps mountains
06	Coat of arms of department 06	26 February 1790	Alpes-Maritimes	Nice	Provence-Alpes-Côte d'Azur	Alps mountains
07	Coat of arms of department 07	26 February 1790	Ardèche	Privas	Auvergne-Rhône-Alpes	Ardèche (river)
08	Coat of arms of department 08	26 February 1790	Ardennes	Charleville-Mézières	Grand Est	Ardennes Forest
09	Coat of arms of department 09	26 February 1790	Ariège	Foix	Occitanie	Ariège (river)
10	Coat of arms of department 10	26 February 1790	Aube	Troyes	Grand Est	Aube (river)
11	Coat of arms of department 11	26 February 1790	Aude	Carcassonne	Occitanie	Aude (river)
12	Coat of arms of department 12	26 February 1790	Aveyron	Rodez	Occitanie	Aveyron (river)
13	Coat of arms of department 13	26 February 1790	Bouches-du-Rhône	Marseille	Provence-Alpes-Côte d'Azur	Rhône (river)
14	Coat of arms of department 14	26 February 1790	Calvados	Caen	Normandy	Latin calva dorsa ("bare backs"), referring to two offshore rocks
15	Coat of arms of department 15	26 February 1790	Cantal	Aurillac	Auvergne-Rhône-Alpes	Mounts of Cantal
16	Coat of arms of department 16	26 February 1790	Charente	Angoulême	Nouvelle-Aquitaine	Charente (river)
17	Coat of arms of department 17	26 February 1790	Charente-Maritime ^{3}	La Rochelle	Nouvelle-Aquitaine	Charente (river)
18	Coat of arms of department 18	26 February 1790	Cher	Bourges	Centre-Val de Loire	Cher (river)
19	Coat of arms of department 19	26 February 1790	Corrèze	Tulle	Nouvelle-Aquitaine	Corrèze (river)
2A	Coat of arms of department 2A	1 January 1979	Corse-du-Sud ^{19}	Ajaccio	Corsica	Island of Corsica and South cardinal direction
2B	Coat of arms of department 2A	1 January 1979	Haute-Corse ^{19}	Bastia	Corsica	Island of Corsica
21	Coat of arms of department 21	26 February 1790	Côte-d'Or	Dijon	Bourgogne-Franche-Comté	Côte d'Or (escarpment)
22	Coat of arms of department 22	26 February 1790	Côtes-d'Armor ^{4}	Saint-Brieuc	Brittany	coasts of Armorica
23	Coat of arms of department 23	26 February 1790	Creuse	Guéret	Nouvelle-Aquitaine	Creuse (river)
24	Coat of arms of department 24	26 February 1790	Dordogne	Périgueux	Nouvelle-Aquitaine	Dordogne (river)
25	Coat of arms of department 25	26 February 1790	Doubs	Besançon	Bourgogne-Franche-Comté	Doubs (river)
26	Coat of arms of department 26	26 February 1790	Drôme	Valence	Auvergne-Rhône-Alpes	Drôme (river)
27	Coat of arms of department 27	26 February 1790	Eure	Évreux	Normandy	Eure (river)
28	Coat of arms of department 28	26 February 1790	Eure-et-Loir	Chartres	Centre-Val de Loire	Eure and Loir rivers
29	Coat of arms of department 29	26 February 1790	Finistère	Quimper	Brittany	Latin Finis Terrae (the end of the earth, land’s end)
30	Coat of arms of department 30	26 February 1790	Gard	Nîmes	Occitanie	Occitan name for Gardon river
31	Coat of arms of department 31	26 February 1790	Haute-Garonne	Toulouse	Occitanie	Garonne (river)
32	Coat of arms of department 32	26 February 1790	Gers	Auch	Occitanie	Gers (river)
33	Coat of arms of department 33	26 February 1790	Gironde ^{5}	Bordeaux	Nouvelle-Aquitaine	Gironde estuary
34	Coat of arms of department 34	26 February 1790	Hérault	Montpellier	Occitanie	Hérault (river)
35	Coat of arms of department 35	26 February 1790	Ille-et-Vilaine	Rennes	Brittany	Ille and Vilaine rivers
36	Coat of arms of department 36	26 February 1790	Indre	Châteauroux	Centre-Val de Loire	Indre (river)
37	Coat of arms of department 37	26 February 1790	Indre-et-Loire	Tours	Centre-Val de Loire	Indre and Loire rivers
38	Coat of arms of department 38	26 February 1790	Isère	Grenoble	Auvergne-Rhône-Alpes	Isère (river)
39	Coat of arms of department 39	26 February 1790	Jura	Lons-le-Saunier	Bourgogne-Franche-Comté	Jura Mountains
40	Coat of arms of department 40	26 February 1790	Landes	Mont-de-Marsan	Nouvelle-Aquitaine	Heathlands (lande) that dominated the region at the time
41	Coat of arms of department 41	26 February 1790	Loir-et-Cher	Blois	Centre-Val de Loire	Loir and Cher rivers
42	Coat of arms of department 42	12 August 1793	Loire	Saint-Étienne	Auvergne-Rhône-Alpes	Loire (river)
43	Coat of arms of department 43	26 February 1790	Haute-Loire	Le Puy-en-Velay	Auvergne-Rhône-Alpes	Loire (river)
44	Coat of arms of department 44	26 February 1790	Loire-Atlantique ^{6}	Nantes	Pays de la Loire	Loire (river) and Atlantic Ocean
45	Coat of arms of department 45	26 February 1790	Loiret	Orléans	Centre-Val de Loire	Loiret (river)
46	Coat of arms of department 46	26 February 1790	Lot	Cahors	Occitanie	Lot (river)
47	Coat of arms of department 47	26 February 1790	Lot-et-Garonne	Agen	Nouvelle-Aquitaine	Lot and Garonne rivers
48	Coat of arms of department 48	26 February 1790	Lozère	Mende	Occitanie	Mont Lozère
49	Coat of arms of department 49	26 February 1790	Maine-et-Loire ^{7}	Angers	Pays de la Loire	Maine and Loire rivers
50	Coat of arms of department 50	26 February 1790	Manche	Saint-Lô	Normandy	English Channel
51	Coat of arms of department 51	26 February 1790	Marne	Châlons-en-Champagne	Grand Est	Marne (river)
52	Coat of arms of department 52	26 February 1790	Haute-Marne	Chaumont	Grand Est	Marne (river)
53	Coat of arms of department 53	26 February 1790	Mayenne	Laval	Pays de la Loire	Mayenne (river)
54	Coat of arms of department 54	7 September 1871	Meurthe-et-Moselle	Nancy	Grand Est	Meurthe and Moselle rivers
55	Coat of arms of department 55	26 February 1790	Meuse	Bar-le-Duc	Grand Est	Meuse (river)
56	Coat of arms of department 56	26 February 1790	Morbihan	Vannes	Brittany	Gulf of Morbihan
57	Coat of arms of department 57	26 February 1790	Moselle	Metz	Grand Est	Moselle (river)
58	Coat of arms of department 58	26 February 1790	Nièvre	Nevers	Bourgogne-Franche-Comté	Nièvre (river)
59	Coat of arms of department 59	26 February 1790	Nord	Lille	Hauts-de-France	North cardinal direction
60	Coat of arms of department 60	26 February 1790	Oise	Beauvais	Hauts-de-France	Oise (river)
61	Coat of arms of department 61	26 February 1790	Orne	Alençon	Normandy	Orne (river)
62	Coat of arms of department 62	26 February 1790	Pas-de-Calais	Arras	Hauts-de-France	Strait of Dover
63	Coat of arms of department 63	26 February 1790	Puy-de-Dôme	Clermont-Ferrand	Auvergne-Rhône-Alpes	Puy de Dôme volcano
64	Coat of arms of department 64	26 February 1790	Pyrénées-Atlantiques ^{8}	Pau	Nouvelle-Aquitaine	Pyrenees mountains and Atlantic Ocean
65	Coat of arms of department 65	26 February 1790	Hautes-Pyrénées	Tarbes	Occitanie	Pyrenees mountains
66	Coat of arms of department 66	26 February 1790	Pyrénées-Orientales	Perpignan	Occitanie	Pyrenees mountains and East cardinal direction
67	Coat of arms of department 67	26 February 1790	Bas-Rhin	Strasbourg	Grand Est	Rhine (river)
68	Coat of arms of department 68	26 February 1790	Haut-Rhin	Colmar	Grand Est	Rhine (river)
69D	Coat of arms of department 69	12 August 1793	Rhône	Lyon (provisional)	Auvergne-Rhône-Alpes	Rhône (river)
69M	Coat of arms of Lyon	1 January 2015	Lyon Metropolis ^{18}	Lyon	Auvergne-Rhône-Alpes	commune of Lyon
70	Coat of arms of department 70	26 February 1790	Haute-Saône	Vesoul	Bourgogne-Franche-Comté	Saône (river)
71	Coat of arms of department 71	26 February 1790	Saône-et-Loire	Mâcon	Bourgogne-Franche-Comté	Saône and Loire rivers
72	Coat of arms of department 72	26 February 1790	Sarthe	Le Mans	Pays de la Loire	Sarthe (river)
73	Coat of arms of department 73	15 June 1860	Savoie	Chambéry	Auvergne-Rhône-Alpes	region of Savoy
74	Coat of arms of department 74	15 June 1860	Haute-Savoie	Annecy	Auvergne-Rhône-Alpes	region of Savoy
75	Coat of arms of department 75	1 January 1968	Paris ^{9}	Paris	Île-de-France	commune of Paris
76	Coat of arms of department 76	26 February 1790	Seine-Maritime ^{10}	Rouen	Normandy	Seine (river)
77	Coat of arms of department 77	26 February 1790	Seine-et-Marne	Melun	Île-de-France	Seine and Marne rivers
78	Coat of arms of department 78	1 January 1968	Yvelines ^{11}	Versailles	Île-de-France	Forest of Yvelines
79	Coat of arms of department 79	26 February 1790	Deux-Sèvres	Niort	Nouvelle-Aquitaine	Sèvre Nantaise and Sèvre Niortaise rivers
80	Coat of arms of department 80	26 February 1790	Somme	Amiens	Hauts-de-France	Somme (river)
81	Coat of arms of department 81	26 February 1790	Tarn	Albi	Occitanie	Tarn (river)
82	Coat of arms of department 82	4 November 1808	Tarn-et-Garonne	Montauban	Occitanie	Tarn and Garonne rivers
83	Coat of arms of department 83	26 February 1790	Var	Toulon	Provence-Alpes-Côte d'Azur	Var (river)
84	Coat of arms of department 84	25 June 1793	Vaucluse	Avignon	Provence-Alpes-Côte d'Azur	Fontaine de Vaucluse spring
85	Coat of arms of department 85	26 February 1790	Vendée	La Roche-sur-Yon	Pays de la Loire	Vendée (river)
86	Coat of arms of department 86	26 February 1790	Vienne	Poitiers	Nouvelle-Aquitaine	Vienne (river)
87	Coat of arms of department 87	26 February 1790	Haute-Vienne	Limoges	Nouvelle-Aquitaine	Vienne (river)
88	Coat of arms of department 88	26 February 1790	Vosges	Épinal	Grand Est	Vosges Mountains
89	Coat of arms of department 89	26 February 1790	Yonne	Auxerre	Bourgogne-Franche-Comté	Yonne (river)
90	Coat of arms of department 90	11 March 1922	Territoire de Belfort	Belfort	Bourgogne-Franche-Comté	commune of Belfort
91	Coat of arms of department 91	1 January 1968	Essonne ^{12}	Évry-Courcouronnes	Île-de-France	Essonne (river)
92	Coat of arms of department 92	1 January 1968	Hauts-de-Seine ^{13}	Nanterre	Île-de-France	Seine (river)
93	Coat of arms of department 93	1 January 1968	Seine-Saint-Denis ^{14}	Bobigny	Île-de-France	Seine (river) and commune of Saint-Denis
94	Coat of arms of department 94	1 January 1968	Val-de-Marne	Créteil	Île-de-France	Marne (river)
95	Coat of arms of department 95	1 January 1968	Val-d'Oise	Pontoise ^{15}	Île-de-France	Oise (river)
971	Coat of arms of Guadeloupe	19 March 1946	Guadeloupe ^{16}	Basse-Terre	Guadeloupe	Island of Guadeloupe
972	Coat of arms of Martinique	19 March 1946	Martinique ^{16}	Fort-de-France	Martinique	Island of Martinique
973	Coat of arms of Guyane	19 March 1946	Guyane ^{16}	Cayenne	French Guiana	The Guianas
974	Coat of arms of Réunion	19 March 1946	La Réunion ^{16}	Saint-Denis	Réunion	Island of Réunion
976	Coat of arms of Mayotte	9 August 2009; 31 March 2011	Mayotte ^{17}	Mamoudzou	Mayotte	Island of Mayotte

Notes:
- ^1 Most of the coats of arms are unofficial
- ^2 Alpes-de-Haute-Provence was known as Basses-Alpes ('Lower Alps') until 1970
- ^3 Charente-Maritime was known as Charente-Inférieure ('Lower Charente') until 1941
- ^4 Côtes-d'Armor was known as Côtes-du-Nord ('Coasts of the North') until 1990
- ^5 Gironde was known as Bec-d'Ambès ('Beak of Ambès') from 1793 until 1795. The Convention eliminated the name to avoid recalling the outlawed Girondin political faction.
- ^6 Loire-Atlantique was known as Loire-Inférieure ('Lower Loire') until 1957
- ^7 Maine-et-Loire was known as Mayenne-et-Loire (Mayenne and Loire rivers) until 1791
- ^8 Pyrénées-Atlantiques was known as Basses-Pyrénées ('Lower Pyrenees') until 1969
- ^9 Number 75 was formerly assigned to Seine
- ^10 Seine-Maritime was known as Seine-Inférieure ('Lower Seine') until 1955
- ^11 Number 78 was formerly assigned to Seine-et-Oise
- ^12 Number 91 was formerly assigned to Alger, in French Algeria
- ^13 Number 92 was formerly assigned to Oran, in French Algeria
- ^14 Number 93 was formerly assigned to Constantine, in French Algeria
- ^15 The prefecture of Val-d'Oise was established in Pontoise when the department was created, but moved de facto to the neighbouring commune of Cergy; currently, both part of the ville nouvelle of Cergy-Pontoise
- ^16 The overseas departments each constitute a region and enjoy a status identical to metropolitan France. They are part of France and the European Union, though special EU rules apply to them.
- ^17 Mayotte became the 101st department of France on 31 March 2011. The INSEE code of Mayotte is 976 (975 is already assigned to the French overseas collectivity of Saint Pierre and Miquelon)
- ^18 Metropoles with territorial collectivity statute.
- ^19 Corsica was divided into two departments (Golo and Liamone) from 1793 to 1811, and again into two departments (Corse-du-Sud, number 2A, and Haute-Corse, number 2B) in 1975. As of 2019, Corse-du-Sud and Haute-Corse are still administrative departments, although they no longer have the status of departmental "territorial collectivities": region and department functions have been managed by a "single territorial collectivity" since 2018.

Regions and departments of metropolitan France; the numbers are those of the first column (except for Corsica, which shows the division of the island until 2018, and the division of the Metropolis of Lyon from Rhône is not shown).

The departments in the immediate vicinity of Paris; the numbers are those of the first column.

=== Former departments ===
==== Former departments of the current territory of France ====
No.	Department	Prefecture	Dates in existence	Named after	Subsequent history
–	Rhône-et-Loire	Lyon	1790–1793	Rhône and Loire rivers	Divided into Rhône and Loire.
–	Corse	Bastia	1790–1793	Island of Corsica	Divided into Golo and Liamone.
–	Golo	Bastia	1793–1811	Golo (river)	Reunited with Liamone into Corse.
–	Liamone	Ajaccio	1793–1811	Liamone (river)	Reunited with Golo into Corse.
–	Mont-Blanc	Chambéry	1792–1815	Mont Blanc mountain	Formed from part of the Duchy of Savoy, a territory of the Kingdom of Piedmont-Sardinia which was restored to its former status at the Treaty of Paris (1815). The territory returned to French rule in 1860 and it corresponds approximately to the present departments of Savoie and Haute-Savoie.
–	Léman	Geneva	1798–1814	Lake Geneva	Formed when the Republic of Geneva was annexed into the French First Republic and added to territory taken from other departments. Corresponds to the present Swiss canton of Geneva and parts of the current departments of Ain and Haute-Savoie.
–	Meurthe	Nancy	1790–1871	Meurthe (river)	Ceased to exist following the annexation of Alsace-Lorraine by the German Empire in 1871 and was not recreated after the province was restored to France by the Treaty of Versailles.
75	Seine	Paris	1790–1967	Seine (river)	Divided into four new departments on 1 January 1968: Paris, Hauts-de-Seine, Seine-Saint-Denis, and Val-de-Marne (the last also incorporating a small amount of territory from Seine-et-Oise).
78	Seine-et-Oise	Versailles	1790–1967	Seine and Oise rivers	Divided into four new departments on 1 January 1968: Yvelines, Val-d'Oise, Essonne, Val-de-Marne (the last largely comprising territory from Seine).
20	Corse	Ajaccio	1811–1975	Island of Corsica	Divided into Corse-du-Sud and Haute-Corse.
975	Saint Pierre and Miquelon	Saint-Pierre	1976–1985	Islands of Saint Pierre and Miquelon	Converted to an overseas collectivity.

==== Departments of Algeria (Départements d'Algérie) ====
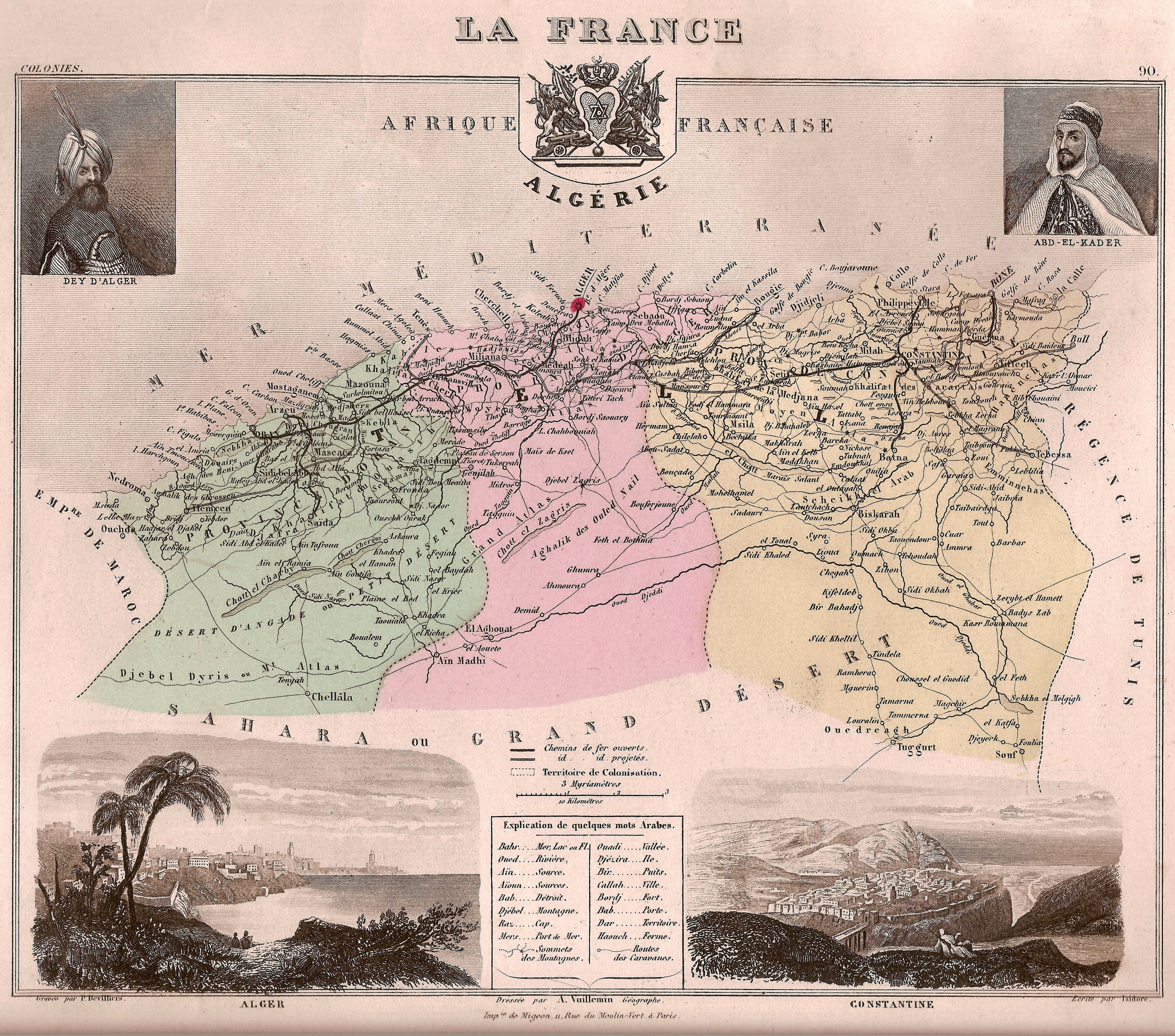
The three Algerian departments in 1848

Departments of French Algeria from 1957 to 1962

Unlike the rest of the French possessions in Africa, Algeria was divided into departments just like Corsica and Normandy from 1848 until its independence in 1962. These departments were supposed to be "assimilated" or "integrated" into France sometime in the future.

Before 1957
No.	Department	Prefecture	Dates of existence
91	Alger	Algiers	1848–1957
92	Oran	Oran	1848–1957
93	Constantine	Constantine	1848–1957
–	Bône	Annaba	1955–1957

1957–1962
No.	Department	Prefecture	Dates of existence
8A	Oasis	Ouargla	1957–1962
8B	Saoura	Béchar	1957–1962
9A	Alger	Algiers	1957–1962
9B	Batna	Batna	1957–1962
9C	Bône	Annaba	1955–1962
9D	Constantine	Constantine	1957–1962
9E	Médéa	Médéa	1957–1962
9F	Mostaganem	Mostaganem	1957–1962
9G	Oran	Oran	1957–1962
9H	Orléansville	Chlef	1957–1962
9J	Sétif	Sétif	1957–1962
9K	Tiaret	Tiaret	1957–1962
9L	Tizi Ouzou	Tizi Ouzou	1957–1962
9M	Tlemcen	Tlemcen	1957–1962
9N	Aumale	Sour El-Ghozlane	1958–1959
9P	Bougie	Béjaïa	1958–1962
9R	Saïda	Saïda	1958–1962

==== Departments in former French colonies ====
Department	Named after	Current location	Dates in existence
Département du Sud	South cardinal direction	Haiti	1795–1800
Département d'Inganne		Dominican Republic, Haiti	1795–1800
Département du Nord	North cardinal direction	Haiti	1795–1800
Département de l'Ouest	West cardinal direction	Haiti	1795–1800
Département de Samana	Samaná Bay	Dominican Republic	1795–1800
Sainte-Lucie	Island of St Lucia	Saint Lucia, Tobago	1795–1800
Île de France	Island of Mauritius	Mauritius, Seychelles	1795–1800
Indes-Orientales	India and East cardinal direction	India: Pondicherry Union Territory (Pondichéry, Karikal, Yanaon, Mahé) West Bengal (Chandernagore)	1795–1800

==== Departments of the Napoleonic Empire in Europe ====
There are a number of former departments in territories conquered by France during the French Revolution and Napoleonic Empire that are now not part of France:

Department	Prefecture (French name if different)	Named after	Current location^{1}	Contemporary location^{2}	Dates in existence
Mont-Terrible	Porrentruy	Mont Terri mountain	Switzerland; France (Doubs)	Holy Roman Empire: Prince-Bishopric of Basel^{3} County of Montbéliard	1793–1800
Dyle	Brussels; Bruxelles	Dyle (river)	Belgium	Austrian Netherlands: Duchy of Brabant County of Hainaut	1795–1814
Escaut	Ghent; Gand	Scheldt river	Belgium; Netherlands	Austrian Netherlands: County of Flanders Dutch Republic: Flanders of the States	1795–1814
Forêts	Luxembourg	Ardennes forest	Luxembourg; Belgium; Germany	Austrian Netherlands: Duchy of Luxembourg	1795–1814
Jemmape	Mons	Battle of Jemappes	Belgium	Austrian Netherlands: County of Hainaut Lordship of Tournai County of Namur Holy Roman Empire: Prince-Bishopric of Liège	1795–1814
Lys	Bruges	Lys (river)	Belgium	Austrian Netherlands: County of Flanders	1795–1814
Meuse-Inférieure	Maastricht; Maëstricht	Meuse river	Belgium; Netherlands	Austrian Netherlands: Austrian Upper Guelders Duchy of Limburg Dutch Republic: Dutch Upper Guelders Overmaas of the States Holy Roman Empire: Prince-Bishopric of Liège: County of Horne County of Loon Thorn Abbey Maastricht^{5}	1795–1814
Deux-Nèthes	Antwerp; Anvers	Two branches of the Nete (river)	Belgium; Netherlands	Austrian Netherlands: Duchy of Brabant Dutch Republic: Brabant of the States (after 1810)	1795–1814
Ourthe	Liège	Ourthe river	Belgium; Germany	Austrian Netherlands: Duchy of Brabant Duchy of Limburg Duchy of Luxembourg County of Namur Holy Roman Empire: Prince-Bishopric of Liège Imperial Abbey of Stavelot-Malmedy	1795–1814
Sambre-et-Meuse	Namur	Sambre and Meuse rivers	Belgium	Austrian Netherlands: Duchy of Brabant Duchy of Luxembourg Holy Roman Empire: Prince-Bishopric of Liège	1795–1814
Corcyre	Corfu; Corfou	Island of Corfu (archaic French form)	Greece	Republic of Venice^{4}	1797–1799
Ithaque	Argostoli	Island of Ithaca	Greece	Republic of Venice^{4}	1797–1798
Mer-Égée	Zakynthos; Zante	Aegean Sea	Greece	Republic of Venice^{4}	1797–1798
Mont-Tonnerre	Mainz; Mayence	Donnersberg mountain	Germany	Holy Roman Empire: Archbishopric of Mainz Electorate of the Palatinate Bishopric of Speyer	1801–1814
Rhin-et-Moselle	Koblenz; Coblence	Rhine and Moselle rivers	Germany	Holy Roman Empire: Archbishopric of Cologne Electorate of the Palatinate Archbishopric of Trier	1801–1814
Roer	Aachen; Aix-la-Chapelle	Roer river	Germany; Netherlands	Holy Roman Empire: Free Imperial City of Aachen Archbishopric of Cologne Electorate of the Palatinate: Grand Duchy of Berg Duchy of Jülich Kingdom of Prussia: Prussian Guelders Imperial Free City of Wesel (after 1805)	1801–1814
Sarre	Trier; Trèves	Saar (river)	Belgium; Germany	Holy Roman Empire: Electorate of the Palatinate: County of Veldenz Duchy of Zweibrücken Archbishopric of Trier	1801–1814
Doire	Ivrea; Ivrée	Dora Baltea river	Italy	Kingdom of Piedmont-Sardinia: Duchy of Savoy	1802–1814
Marengo	Alessandria; Alexandrie	Battle of Marengo	Italy	Kingdom of Piedmont-Sardinia: Duchy of Savoy	1802–1814
Pô	Turin	Po (river)	Italy	Kingdom of Piedmont-Sardinia: Duchy of Savoy	1802–1814
Sésia	Vercelli; Verceil	Sesia river	Italy	Kingdom of Piedmont-Sardinia: Duchy of Savoy	1802–1814
Stura	Cuneo; Coni	Stura di Demonte river	Italy	Kingdom of Piedmont-Sardinia: Duchy of Savoy	1802–1814
Tanaro^{6}	Asti	Tanaro (river)	Italy	Kingdom of Piedmont-Sardinia: Duchy of Savoy	1802–1805
Apennins	Chiavari	Apennine Mountains	Italy	Republic of Genoa^{7}	1805–1814
Gênes	Genoa; Gênes	City of Genoa	Italy	Republic of Genoa^{7}	1805–1814
Montenotte	Savona; Savone	Battle of Montenotte	Italy	Republic of Genoa^{7}	1805–1814
Arno	Florence	Arno (river)	Italy	Grand Duchy of Tuscany^{8}	1808–1814
Méditerranée (department)	Livorno; Livourne	Mediterranean Sea	Italy	Grand Duchy of Tuscany^{8}	1808–1814
Ombrone	Siena; Sienne	Ombrone river	Italy	Grand Duchy of Tuscany^{8}	1808–1814
Taro	Parma; Parme	Taro (river)	Italy	Holy Roman Empire: Duchy of Parma & Piacenza	1808–1814
Rome^{9}	Rome	City of Rome	Italy	Papal States	1809–1814
Trasimène	Spoleto; Spolète	Lake Trasimeno	Italy	Papal States	1809–1814
Bouches-du-Rhin	's-Hertogenbosch; Bois-le-Duc	Rhine river	Netherlands	Dutch Republic:^{10} Batavian Brabant (Brabant of the States) Dutch Guelders	1810–1814
Bouches-de-l'Escaut	Middelburg; Middelbourg	Scheldt river	Netherlands	Dutch Republic:^{10} County of Zeeland	1810–1814
Simplon	Sion	Simplon Pass	Switzerland	République des Sept-Dizains^{11}	1810–1814
Bouches-de-la-Meuse	The Hague; La Haye	Meuse river	Netherlands	Dutch Republic:^{10} County of Holland	1811–1814
Bouches-de-l'Yssel	Zwolle	IJssel river	Netherlands	Dutch Republic:^{10} Overijssel	1811–1814
Ems-Occidental	Groningen; Groningue	Ems (river)	Netherlands; Germany	Dutch Republic:^{10} Dutch Upper Guelders	1811–1814
Ems-Oriental	Aurich	Ems (river)	Germany	Holy Roman Empire: Kingdom of Prussia: County of East Frisia^{10}	1811–1814
Frise	Leeuwarden; Leuwarden	Friesland region	Netherlands	Dutch Republic:^{10} Friesland	1811–1814
Yssel-Supérieur	Arnhem	IJssel river	Netherlands	Dutch Republic:^{10} Dutch Upper Guelders	1811–1814
Zuyderzée	Amsterdam	Zuiderzee inlet	Netherlands	Dutch Republic:^{10} County of Holland Lordship of Utrecht	1811–1814
Bouches-de-l'Elbe	Hamburg; Hambourg	Elbe river	Germany	Holy Roman Empire: Free Hanseatic City of Hamburg Electorate of Hanover Free Hanseatic City of Lübeck	1811–1814
Bouches-du-Weser	Bremen; Brême	Weser river	Germany	Holy Roman Empire: Free Hanseatic City of Bremen Electorate of Hanover Duchy of Oldenburg	1811–1814
Ems-Supérieur	Osnabrück	Ems (river)	Germany	Holy Roman Empire: Electorate of Hanover Bishopric of Osnabrück Kingdom of Prussia: Town and County of Lingen Principality of Minden County of Ravensberg	1811–1814
Lippe^{12}	Münster; Munster	Lippe (river)	Germany	Holy Roman Empire: Bishopric of Münster Electorate of the Palatinate: Grand Duchy of Berg	1811–1814
Bouches-de-l'Èbre	Lleida; Lérida	Ebro river	Spain	Kingdom of Spain: Catalonia	1812–1813
Montserrat	Barcelona; Barcelone	Montserrat (mountain)	Spain	Kingdom of Spain: Catalonia	1812–1813
Ter	Girona; Gérone	Ter (river)	Spain	Kingdom of Spain: Catalonia	1812–1813
Sègre	Puigcerdà; Puigcerda	Segre (river)	Spain; Andorra	Kingdom of Spain: Catalonia Principality of Andorra	1812–1813
Bouches-de-l'Èbre-Montserrat	Barcelona; Barcelone	Ebro river and Montserrat mountain	Previously the departments of Bouches-de-l'Èbre and Montserrat		1813–1814
Sègre-Ter	Girona; Gérone	Segre and Ter rivers	Previously the departments of Sègre and Ter		1813–1814

Notes for Table 7:

1. Where a Napoleonic department was composed of parts from more than one country, the nation-state containing the prefecture is listed. Please expand this table to list all countries containing significant parts of the department.
2. Territories that were a part of Austrian Netherlands were also a part of Holy Roman Empire.
3. The Bishopric of Basel was a German Prince-Bishopric, not to be confused with the adjacent Swiss Canton of Basel.
4. The Ionian Islands were annexed by France after the Fall of the Republic of Venice. They were lost to France, becoming the Septinsular Republic, a Russo-Ottoman vassal state, from 1800 to 1807, before reverting to France at the Treaty of Tilsit. The second period of French rule lasted until 1810/14, after which these territories became a British protectorate, as the United States of the Ionian Islands
5. Maastricht was a condominium of the Dutch Republic and the Prince-Bishopric of Liège.
6. On 6 June 1805, as a result of the annexation of the Ligurian Republic (the puppet successor state to the Republic of Genoa), Tanaro was abolished and its territory divided between the departments of Marengo, Montenotte and Stura.
7. Before becoming the department of Apennins, the Republic of Genoa was converted to a puppet successor state, the Ligurian Republic.
8. Before becoming the department of Arno, the Grand Duchy of Tuscany was converted to a puppet successor state, the Kingdom of Etruria.
9. Rome was known as the department du Tibre until 1810.
10. Before becoming the departments of Bouches-du-Rhin, Bouches-de-l'Escaut, Bouches-de-la-Meuse, Bouches-de-l'Yssel, Ems-Occidental, Frise, Yssel-Supérieur and Zuyderzée, these territories of the Dutch Republic were converted to a puppet successor state, the Batavian Republic (1795–1806), then those territories that had not already been annexed (all except the first two departments here), along with the Prussian County of East Frisia, were converted to another puppet state, the Kingdom of Holland.
11. Before becoming the department of Simplon, the République des Sept Dizains was converted to a revolutionary République du Valais (16 March 1798) which was swiftly incorporated (1 May 1798) into the puppet Helvetic Republic until 1802 when it became the independent Rhodanic Republic.
12. In the months before Lippe was formed, the arrondissements of Rees and Münster were part of Yssel-Supérieur, the arrondissement of Steinfurt was part of Bouches-de-l'Yssel and the arrondissement of Neuenhaus was part of Ems-Occidental.

== See also ==
- ISO 3166-2:FR
- List of French departments by population, area and population density
- Overseas departments and regions of France
