= Ems-Occidental =

Former French department (1811–1814)

Coordinates: 53.2167°N 6.56667°E

Location of Ems-Occidental in France (1812)

Ems-Occidental within the northern French Empire (1811)

Ems-Occidental (French pronunciation: [ɛms ɔksidɑ̃tal]; Dutch: Wester Eems; German: West-Ems; all lit. 'Western Ems') was a department of the First French Empire in the present-day Netherlands and Germany. It was formed in 1810, when the Kingdom of Holland was annexed by France. Its territory corresponded more or less with the present Dutch provinces of Groningen and Drenthe. Its capital was Groningen. The department was subdivided into the following arrondissements and cantons (situation in 1812):

- Groningen, cantons: Groningen (2 cantons), Hoogezand, Leek and Zuidhorn.
- Appingedam, cantons: Appingedam, Loppersum, Middelstum and Winsum.
- Assen, cantons: Assen, Dalen, Hoogeveen and Meppel.
- Winschoten, cantons: Jemgum, Wedde, Weener and Winschoten.

Its population in 1812 was 191,100.

After Napoleon was defeated in 1814, the department became part of the United Kingdom of the Netherlands, except the canton of Jemgum and most of Weener, which became part of the Kingdom of Hanover (presently part of Lower Saxony, Germany).
