= Bouches-de-l'Yssel =

Former French department (1811–1814)

Coordinates: 52.5167°N 6.0833°E

Location of Bouches-de-l'Yssel in France (1812)

Bouches-de-l'Yssel (French: [buʃ.də.li.sɛl]; "Mouths of the IJssel"; Dutch: Monden van de IJssel) was a department of the First French Empire in the present-day Netherlands. It was formed in 1810, when the Kingdom of Holland was annexed by France. Its territory corresponded with the present-day Dutch province of Overijssel. Its capital was Zwolle.

The department was subdivided into the following arrondissements and cantons (situation in 1812):

- Zwolle, cantons: Hasselt, Kampen, Steenwijk, Vollenhove and Zwolle.
- Almelo, cantons: Almelo, Delden, Enschede, Goor, Oldenzaal and Ootmarsum.
- Deventer, cantons: Deventer, Hardenberg, Ommen and Raalte.

Its population in 1812 was 145,000, and its area was 340,000 hectares.

After Napoleon was defeated in 1814, the department became part of the United Kingdom of the Netherlands.
