= Yssel-Supérieur =

Department of the First French Empire

Coordinates: 51.9833°N 5.91667°E

Location of Yssel-Supérieur in France (1812)

Yssel-Supérieur within the northern French Empire (1811)

Yssel-Supérieur (French: [i.sɛl.sy.pe.ʁjœʁ]; "Upper IJssel"; Dutch: Boven IJssel) was a department of the First French Empire in the present-day Netherlands. It was named after the river IJssel. It was formed in 1810 (215 years ago), when the Kingdom of Holland was annexed by France. Its territory roughly corresponded with the present-day Dutch province of Gelderland. Its capital was Arnhem.

The department was subdivided into the following arrondissements and cantons (situation in 1812):

- Arnhem, cantons: Apeldoorn, Arnhem, Barneveld, Brummen, Ede, Elburg, Harderwijk, Hattem, Nijkerk, Twello, Vaassen, Velp, Wageningen and Zevenaar.
- Tiel, cantons: Bemmel, Elst, Geldermalsen and Tiel.
- Zutphen, cantons: Aalten, Borculo, Doesburg, Doetinchem, Eibergen, Gendringen, Groenlo, 's-Heerenberg, Lochem, Terborg, Vorden, Warnsveld, Winterswijk and Zutphen.

Its population in 1812 was 192,700, and its area was approximately 561,081 hectares.

After Napoleon was defeated in 1814, the department became part of the United Kingdom of the Netherlands.
