= List of people from Rotterdam =

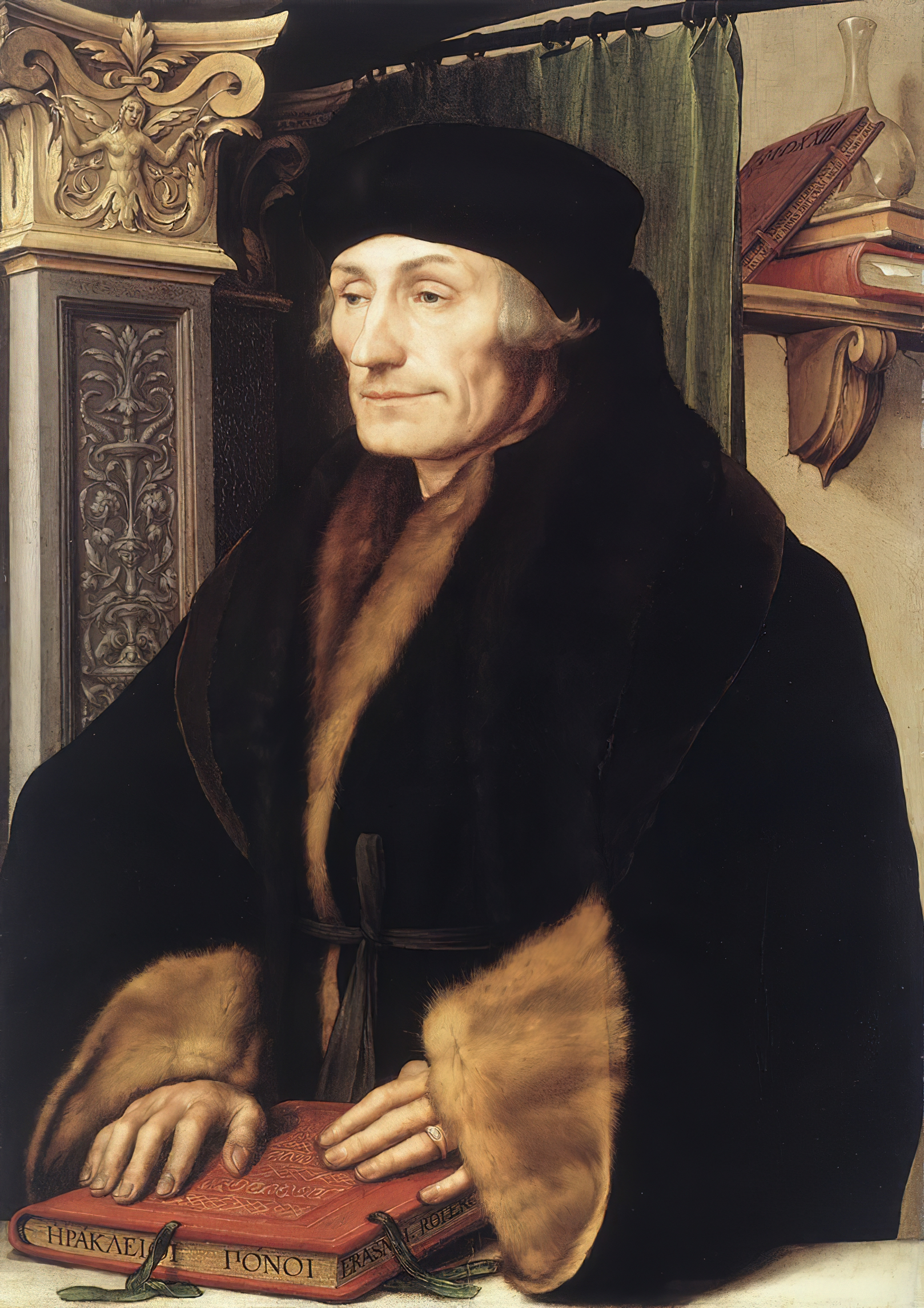
Erasmus of Rotterdam

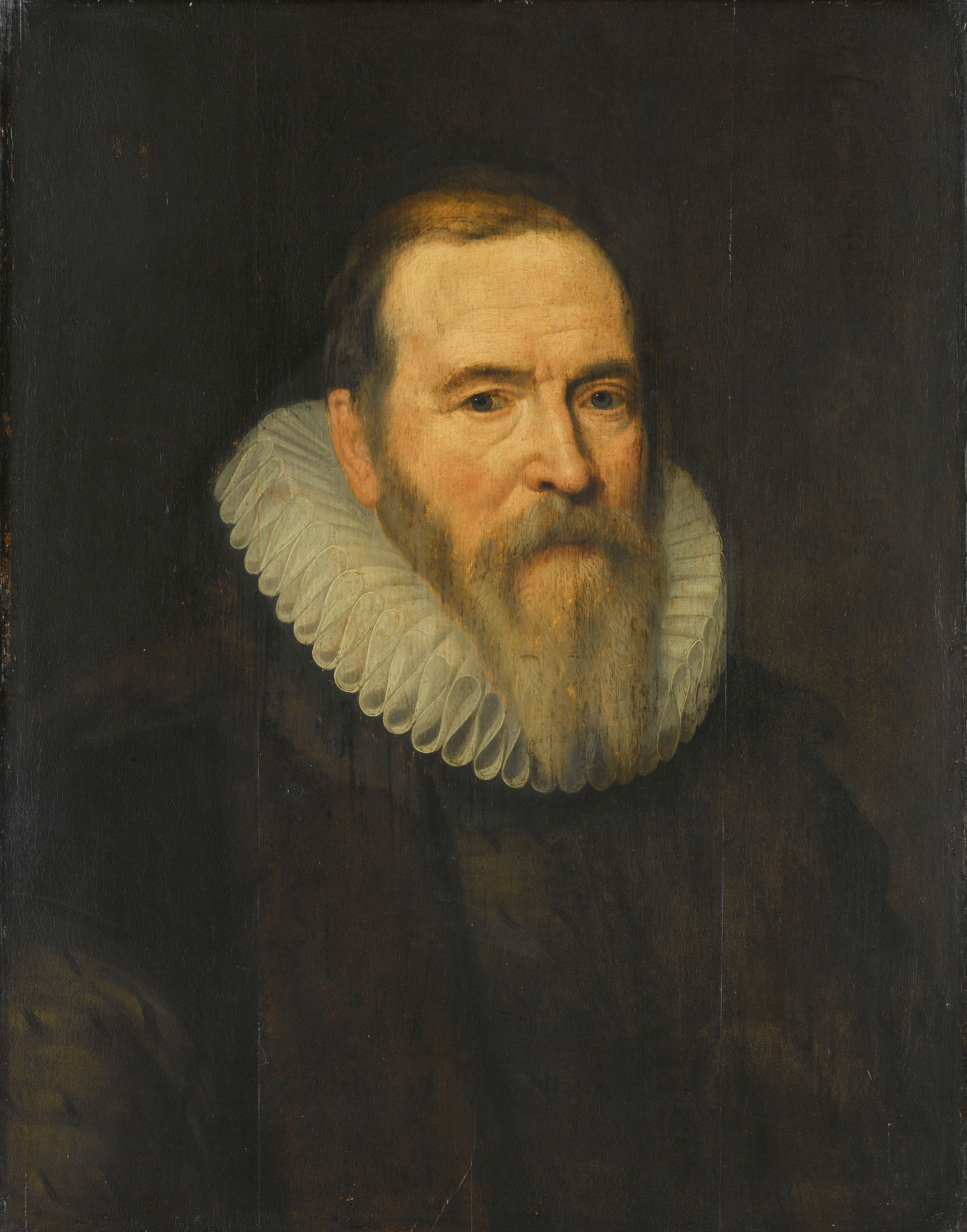
Johan van Oldenbarnevelt

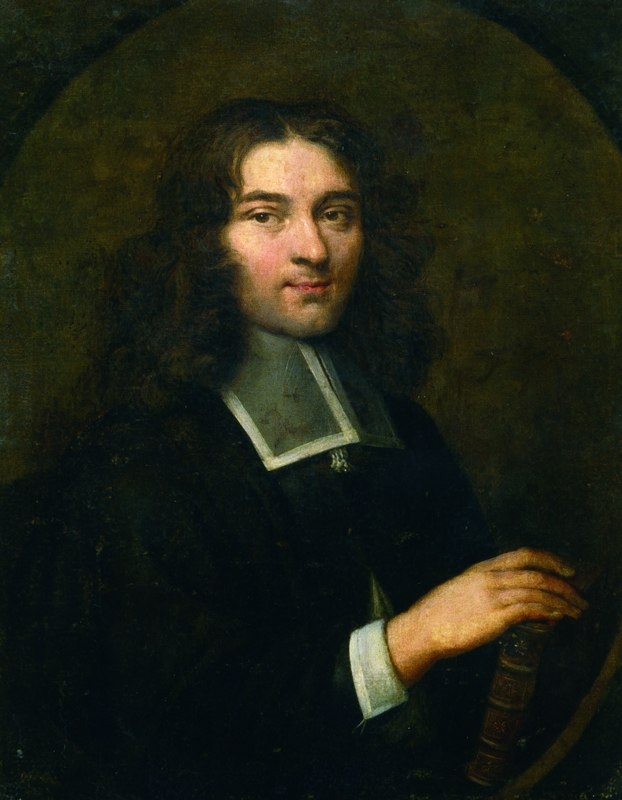
Pierre Bayle

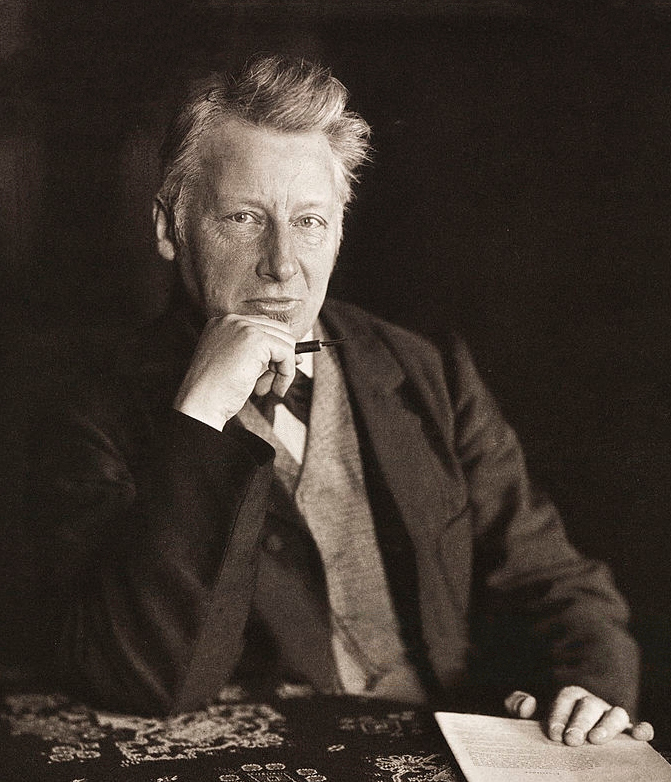
J. van 't Hoff

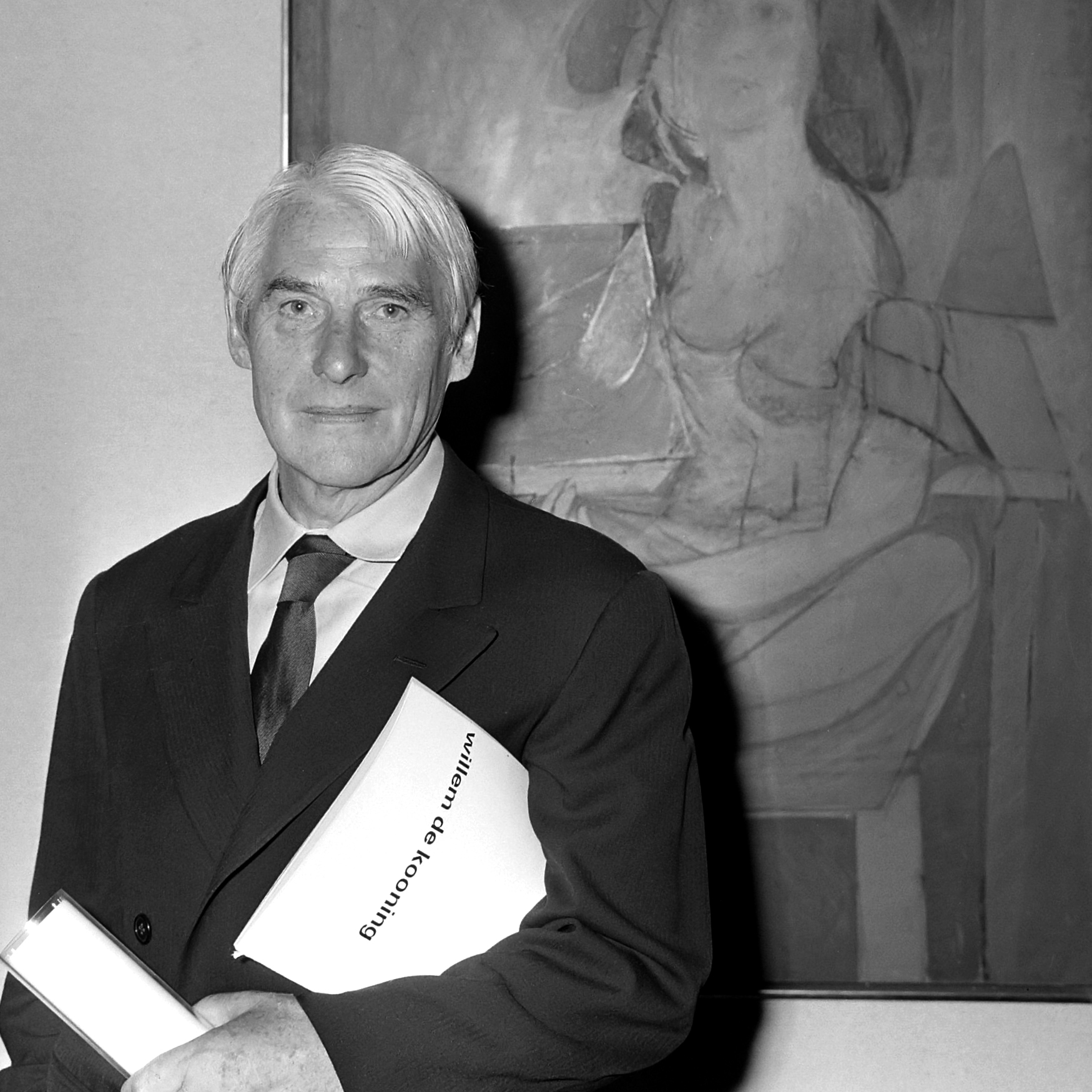
Willem de Kooning

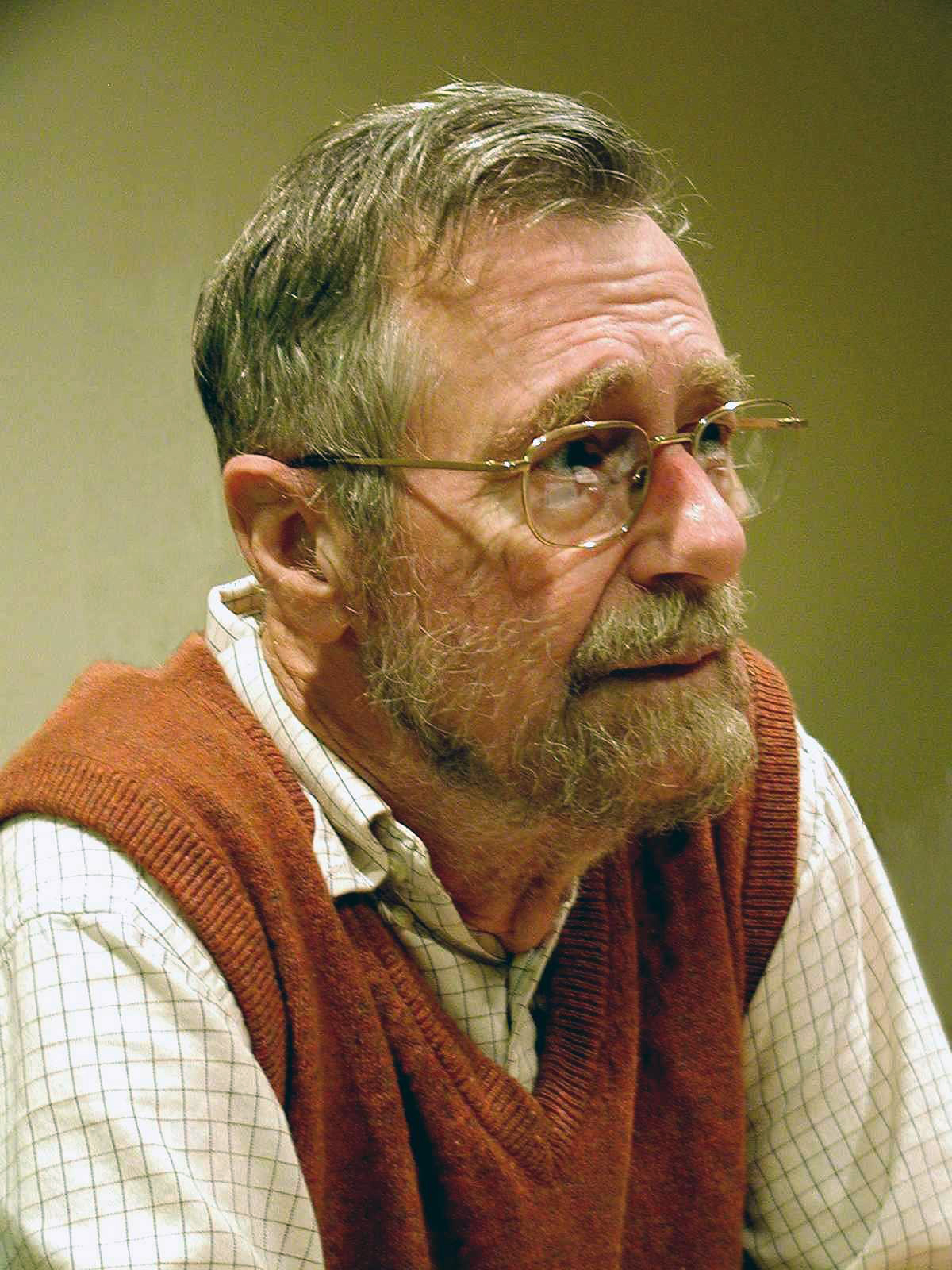
Edsger W. Dijkstra

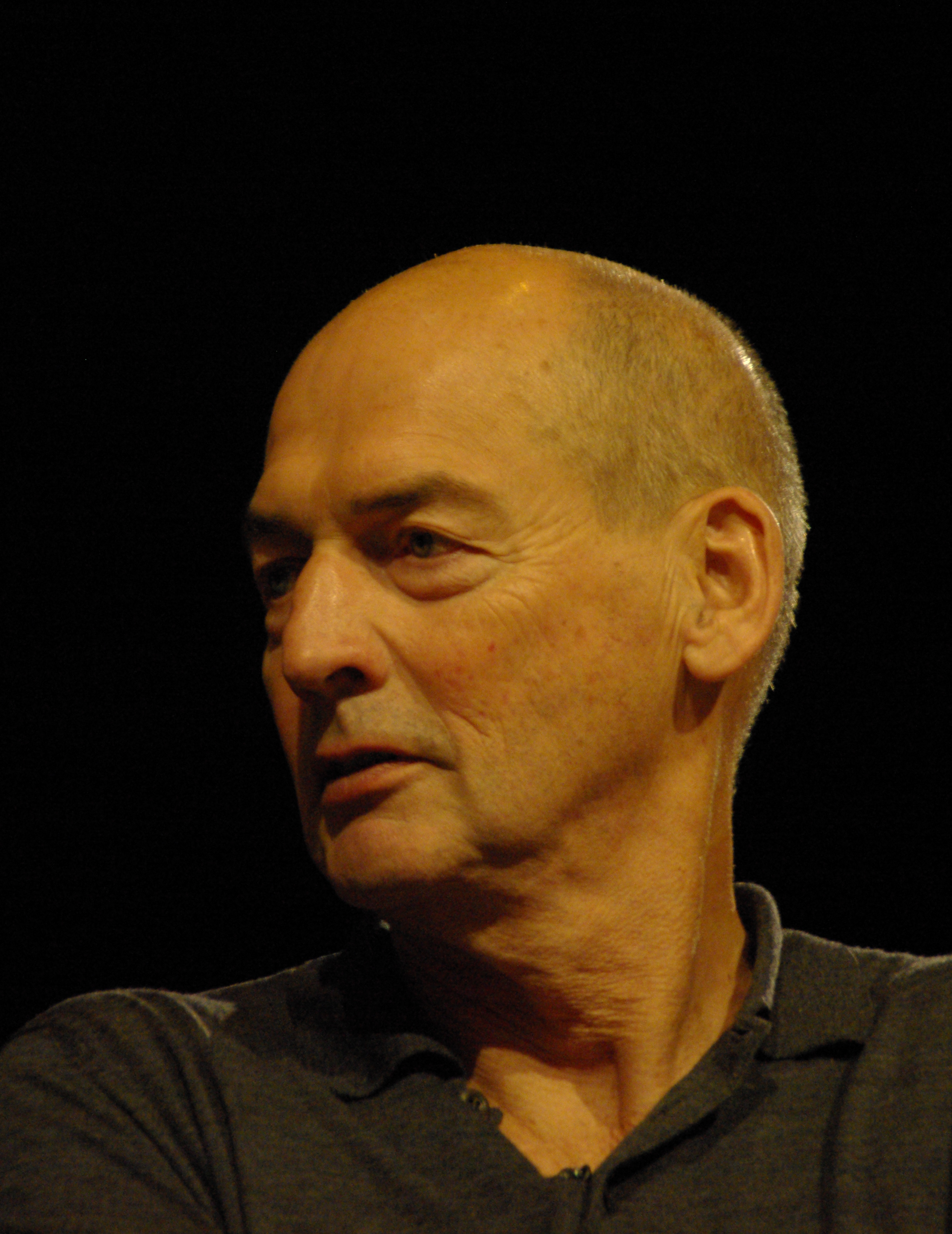
Rem Koolhaas

This is a chronological list of the most notable people from Rotterdam, who were either born and raised there or were long-term residents.

== Born in Rotterdam ==
=== 15th century ===
- Desiderius Erasmus (1466–1536), humanist (long-term resident, born in Gouda)

=== 16th century ===
- Piet Hein (1577–1629), naval officer (born in Delfshaven)
- Willem Pieterszoon Buytewech (1591–1624), painter

=== 17th century ===
- Simon de Vlieger (1601–1653), painter
- Hendrik Martenszoon Sorgh (1610–1670), painter
- Willem Kalf (1619–1693), painter
- Aert Jansse van Nes (1626–1693), naval officer
- Pieter de Hooch (1629–1684), painter
- Pierre Bayle (1647–1706), theologian and philosopher
- Grinling Gibbons (1648–1721), wood carver
- Adriaen van der Werff (1659–1722), painter (born in Kralingen)
- Bernard Mandeville (1670–1733), philosopher, political economist and satirist
- Henrik Brenkman (1681–1736), jurist
- James_Scott,_Duke_of_Monmouth (1649–1685), illegitimate son of Charles II of England

=== 18th century ===
- Pieter Hellendaal (1721–1799), composer
- Gijsbert Karel van Hogendorp (1762–1834), politician
- Johan Gijsbert Verstolk van Soelen (1776–1845), politician
- Hendrik Tollens (1780–1856), poet

=== 19th century ===
- Willem Hendrik de Vriese (1802–1862), botanist
- Jacobus van 't Hoff (1852–1911), chemist
- George Hendrik Breitner (1857–1923), painter
- Sophia Goudstikker (1865–1926), feminist and photographer
- Kees van Dongen (1877–1968), painter
- Hendrik Willem van Loon (1882–1944), writer
- Louis Davids (1883–1939), cabaretier
- Dina Appeldoorn (1884–1938), composer and pianist
- Anthony van Hoboken (1887–1983), musicologist
- Heintje Davids (1888–1975), singer and actress
- Hans Kramers (1894–1952), physicist
- Rudolf van Reest (1897–1979), writer
- Sidney J. van den Bergh (1898–1977), manager, general and politician
- Pieter Menten (1899–1987), art collector and war criminal

=== 20th century ===
==== 1900s ====
- Harry Gideonse (1901–1985), American President of Brooklyn College, and Chancellor of the New School for Social Research
- Willem de Kooning (1904–1997), painter
- Bep van Klaveren (1907–1992), boxer

==== 1910s ====
- Marie Braun (1911–1982), swimmer
- Joseph Luns (1911–2002), politician
- Christiaan Lindemans (1912–1946), double agent
- Leo Fuld (1912–1997), singer
- Annie van 't Zelfde (1913–2002), jazz musician
- Annie de Reuver (1917–2016), singer and record producer
- Marten Toonder (1912–2005), comic artist
- Willy den Ouden (1918–1997), swimmer
- Sacco van der Made (1918–1997), actor (voice of the Dutch Scrooge McDuck)
- Rie Mastenbroek (1919–2003), Olympic 3-time gold medal swimmer

==== 1920s ====
- Nida Senff (1920–1995), swimmer
- Bram Appel (1921–1997), footballer
- Norbert Schmelzer (1921–2008), politician
- George Blake (1922–2020), spy
- Thea Beckman (1923–2004), author
- Faas Wilkes (1923–2006), footballer
- Rita Reys (1924–2013), jazz singer
- Til Gardeniers-Berendsen (1925–2019), politician
- Hans Kuypers (1925–1989), neuroscientist
- Henk Hofland (1927–2016), journalist, columnist and writer

==== 1930s ====
- Bob den Uyl (1930–1992), writer
- Edsger Dijkstra (1930–2002), computer scientist
- Jan Hoogstad (1930–2018), architect
- Gerrit Noordzij (1931–2022), typographer, typeface designer, and author
- Janwillem van de Wetering (1931–2008), writer
- Elly Ameling (born 1933), sopraan
- Toon Meerman (1933–2023), footballer
- Robert Wolders (1936–2018), actor
- Fong Leng (born 1937), Chinese-Dutch fashion designer
- Coen Moulijn (1937–2011), footballer
- Bart Berman (born 1938), pianist
- Greetje Kauffeld (born 1939), jazz singer and Schlager musician
- Ruud Lubbers (1939–2018), politician
- Martin Lodewijk (born 1939), comic artist

==== 1940s ====
- Gerard Cox (1940–2025), cabaretier
- Wim Mager (1940–2008), photographer, director of the Apenheul Primate Park
- Neelie Kroes (born 1941), politician
- Leo Beenhakker (1942–2025), football coach
- Pim Doesburg (1943–2020), football goalkeeper
- Jules Deelder (1944–2019), poet and writer
- Marianne Heemskerk (born 1944), swimmer
- Rem Koolhaas (born 1944), architect
- Heleen Dupuis (born 1945), ethicist, politician
- Betty Stöve (born 1945), tennis player
- Martin van Creveld (born 1946), Israeli military historian
- Wim Jansen (1946–2022), footballer
- André van Duin (born 1947), comedian
- Bill van Dijk (born 1947), musical performer, singer
- Ronald Sørensen (born 1947), politician
- Johnny Young (born 1947), Australian singer
- Pim Fortuyn (1948–2002), politician
- Johan Boskamp (born 1948), footballer, footballmanager and TV personality
- Rudolf van den Berg (1949–2025), film director and screenwriter

==== 1950s ====
- Joke Bruijs (1952–2025), actress, singer, cabaret artist
- Ron Steens (1952–2024), hockey player
- Arthur Benjamins (born 1953), artist
- Ineke Donkervoort (born 1953), rower
- Loes Luca (born 1953), actress, comedian, singer
- Anita Meyer (born 1954), singer
- Willem van Veldhuizen (1954), painter
- Tim Steens (born 1955), hockey player
- Peter Houtman (born 1957), footballer
- Joop Hiele (born 1958), football goalkeeper

==== 1960s ====
- Adrie Andriessen (1960–2021), footballer
- Hans van Baalen (1960–2021), politician
- Euclid Tsakalotos (born 1960), economist, politician
- Berry Westra (born 1961), bridge player
- Paul de Leeuw (born 1962), comedian
- Mario Been (born 1963), footballer, footballmanager
- Jan Mulder (born 1963), pianist, composer, conductor
- Sonny Silooy (born 1963), footballer
- Olaf Ephraim (born 1965), banker, politician
- Francis Hoenselaar (born 1965), dart player
- DJ Sun (born 1966), music producer, DJ, radio host
- Angela Visser (born 1966), model, actress, Miss Holland 1988 and Miss Universe 1989.
- Robert Eenhoorn (born 1968), baseball player

==== 1970s ====
- Winston Bogarde (born 1970), footballer
- Richard Krajicek (born 1971), tennis player
- Kristie Boogert (born 1973), tennis player
- Ferry Corsten (born 1973), musician
- Eline Jurg (born 1973), bobsledder
- Semmy Schilt (born 1973), kickboxer and mixed martial artist
- Brenda Starink (born 1974), swimmer
- Ferry Piekart (born 1974), children's writer
- Giovanni van Bronckhorst (born 1975), footballer
- Michiel van den Bos (born 1975), composer
- Suzanna Lubrano (born 1975), singer
- Remon Stotijn (born 1975), rapper
- Francisco Elson (born 1976), basketball player
- U-Niq (born 1976), rapper
- Madelon Baans (born 1977), swimmer
- Ellery Cairo (born 1978), footballer
- Fatima Moreira de Melo (born 1978), hockey player
- Raemon Sluiter (born 1978), tennis player

==== 1980s ====
- Pascal Bosschaart (born 1980), footballer
- Robert Doornbos (born 1981), racing driver
- Robin van Persie (born 1983), footballer
- Dex Elmont (born 1984), judoka
- Iekeliene Stange (born 1984), fashion model
- Jan Versteegh (born 1985), television presenter and singer
- Feis Ecktuh (1986–2019), rapper
- Luigi Bruins (born 1987), footballer
- Royston Drenthe (born 1987), footballer
- Nouchka Fontijn (born 1987), boxer
- Hef (born 1987), rapper
- Michiel Kramer (born 1988), footballer
- Cuco Martina (born 1989), footballer

==== 1990s ====
- Joan Franka (born 1990), Turkish-Dutch singer
- Georginio Wijnaldum (born 1990), footballer
- Kim de Baat (born 1991), racing cyclist
- Gaite Jansen (born 1991), actress
- Nigel Melker (born 1991), racing driver
- Joey Dale (born 1993), Dutch DJ, electronic music producer
- Abbey Hoes (born 1994), actress
- Rahima Ayla Dirkse (born 1994), model and beauty queen
- Oliver Heldens (born 1995), Dutch DJ, electronic music producer
- Rodny Lopes Cabral (born 1995), footballer
- Denzel Dumfries (born 1996), footballer
- Jordan Larsson (born 1997), Swedish footballer
- Halil Dervişoğlu (born 1999), footballer
- Tyrell Malacia (born 1999), footballer

==== 2000s ====
- Lutsharel Geertruida (born 2000), footballer
- Crysencio Summerville (born 2001), footballer
- Sidny Lopes Cabral (born 2002), footballer
- Jorrel Hato (born 2006), footballer
