= Arthur Benjamin (disambiguation) =

Arthur Benjamin (1893–1960) was an Australian composer.

Arthur Benjamin may also refer to:

- Arthur T. Benjamin (born 1961), American mathematician

== See also ==
- Arthur Benjamins (born 1953), Dutch artist
