= Frans van Lent =

Dutch photographer and performance artist (born 1955)

Frans van Lent (born 1955) is a Dutch photographer and performance artist.

== Early life and education ==
Van Lent was born in Rotterdam. He received his education at the Academie voor Beeldende Vorming (in Dutch) in Tilburg (1974–1979) and MahKU in Utrecht (2012–2014).

== Career; further education ==
Since 2000, he has been a teacher at the Willem de Kooning Academy in Rotterdam.

Until ± 2000 his work consisted of performance-related staged photography. In 2000, he shifted his focus towards process documentation and experience based performance art.

In 2014, Van Lent graduated with a Master of Art in Fine Art from the MaHKU, during which time he developed the concept of Unnoticed Art. In the same year, van Lent initiated and organised the first Unnoticed Art Festival in Haarlem, and started the online free approachable database TheConceptBank.org. In 2015, he published the book Unnoticed Art with Jap Sam Books and started the TheParallelShow performance series. As of January 2018, van Lent had organised ten occasions with varying groups of performance artists in ten different art venues in Europe and the United States. In March 2018, Van Lent edited and published TheParallelShow book, with contributions from all the project's participating artists.

== See also ==
- List of Dutch artists
- List of people from Rotterdam
- List of performance artists
- List of photographers
