= C. C. van Asch van Wijck =

Dutch sculptor (1900–1932)

Cornélie Caroline van Asch van Wijck
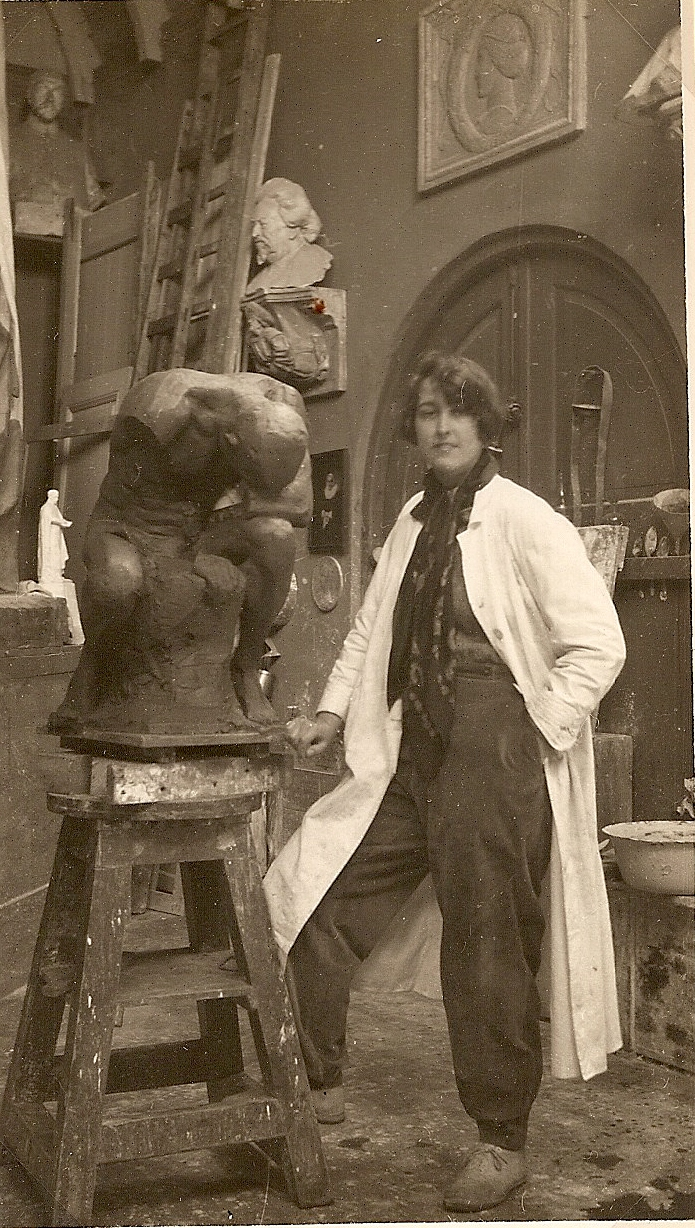
- Born: 17 October 1900; Arnhem, Netherlands
- Died: 18 September 1932 (aged 31); Kasteel Soelen, Zoelen, Netherlands
- Known for: Sculpture
- Movement: Art Deco

Jonkvrouwe (Lady) Cornélie Caroline "Cox" van Asch van Wijck (17 October 1900 – 18 September 1932) was a Dutch artist and sculptor.

== Biography ==
Cornélie Caroline "Cox" van Asch van Wijck was born in Arnhem, the daughter of Jonkheer (Lord) nl:Hubert van Asch van Wijck (1867–1935) and Gravin (Countess) "Wim" Wilhelmina Philippina van Limburg Stirum (1873–1941).

She was the fourth of five children: Constance "Conny", Maurits "Maus", Cecilius "Cecil", Cornélie "Cox" and Wilhelmina Adolphina "Dolph". Cox was named for her Aunt the Christian evangelist, Countess Cornelia van Limburg Stirum, founder of the Christian School for Girls in Arnhem (Christelijke Meisjesschool) later renamed the Limburg Stirumschool.

In early 1914, the family travelled to Suriname. Cox and her two brothers Maus and Cecil were sent to San Francisco for their studies. Cox attended the Anna Head School for Girls in Berkeley, California. She was the Art Editor of the yearbook and had the ambition to become an artist. In 1925 Cox created a bas-relief for her former headmistress Mary Elizabeth Wilson.

On 2 February 1919, Miss Cornelia van Asch van Wyck appears with Dutch Consul van Coenen Torchiana in the San Francisco Chronicle, Society Section. The occasion is a reception for Dutch Naval Officers.

Later that year Cox returned to the Netherlands in company of her father. In 1921 Cox was in England where she nearly got engaged to her cousin Graaf (Count) Constantijn Willem Limburg Stirum (1900–1976) before the family intervened. Back in the Netherlands Cox pursued her schooling in the arts with the sculptor Toon Dupuis, the docent at the Royal Academy of Fine Arts in the Hague (Koninklijke Academie van Beeldende Kunsten).

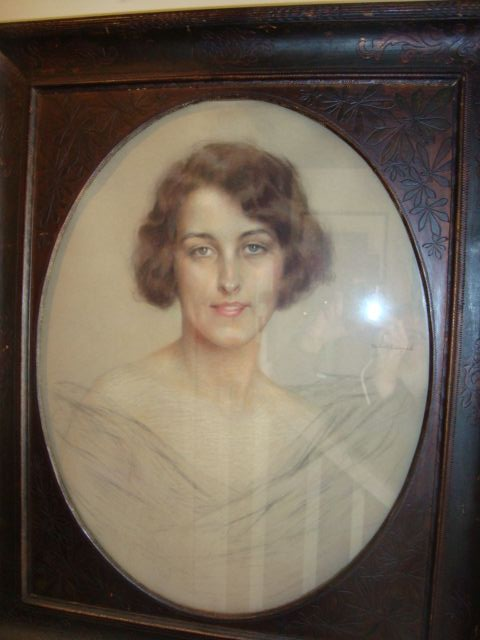
Pastel of C. C. van Asch van Wijck by Gustave Brisgand

C. C. van Asch van Wijck became an active member of the 1920s Hague (Den Haag) artist community both as a model and as a sculptor. Cox modeled for the artists of her day such as the French painter and pastelist Gustave Brisgand, the sculptor and her Professor Toon Dupuis, and Piet van der Hem.

On 7 August 1930, Cox married Hendrik Gerard Johan "Henri" Völcker, Heer van Soelen en den Aldenhaag (Zutphen 16 October 1891, Utrecht 18 December 1955), Henri was the Lord Protector (heer beschermer) of the village of Zoelen a rural community in the Betuwe only accessible by river ferries. Neither the remoteness of her new home nor her married status stopped Cox from making regular trips to The Hague, to the beach at Scheveningen, to Leerdam, to Gouda etc. either with Henri or by herself. At Soelen she set up her atelier in the gatehouse.

On 18 September 1932 C.C. van Asch van Wijck gave birth to a son, Johan Adolph "Dolph" Völcker, Heer van Soelen en den Aldenhaag, Oud and Niew Hinklenoord whom she named for her youngest sister. She did not survive the birth, and died in Zoelen. She was laid to rest in the Church cemetery of the Reformed Church (Hervormde kerk) of Zoelen in presence of the whole village and all its notables, as well as many friends and relatives, two carriages were needed for the wreaths alone. After the benediction "The Lord Völcker van Soelen thanked all present for the extraordinary large turnout and, turning to the grave, he said the words: 'Farewell, darling treasure, who was my everything'". ("De Heer Völcker van Soelen dankte al de aanwezigen voor de buitengewoon groote belangstelling en richtte zich tot het graf met de woorden: Vaarwel, dierbare schat, die alles voor mij was.")

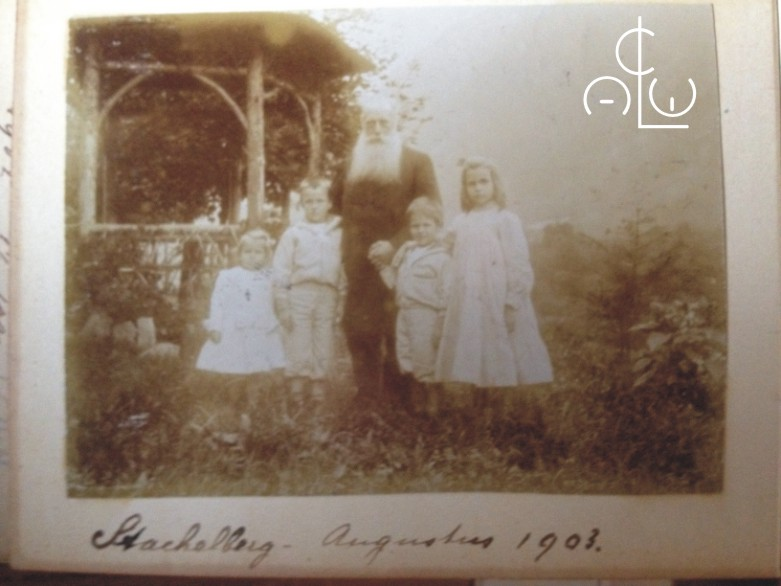
Cox C. C. van Asch van Wijck with her brothers and Grandfather Constantijn Willem van Limburg Stirum (1837–1905)

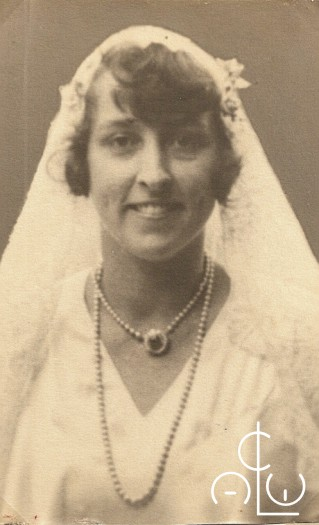
Wedding day Gorssel, 7 August 1930

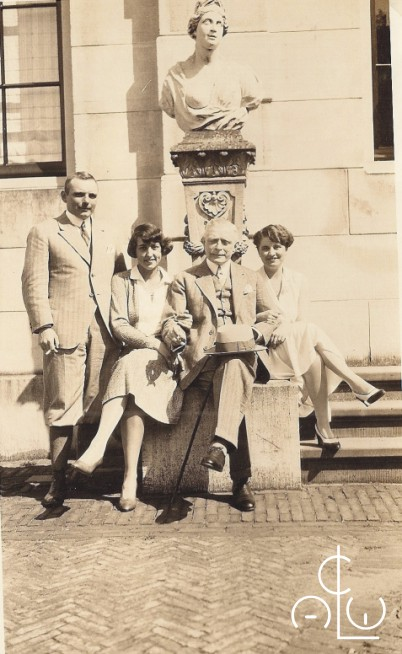
Cox with her husband Henri Hendrik Gerard Johan Völcker van Soelen, her Father in Law Eduard Constant Karel Völcker, and Ms ?

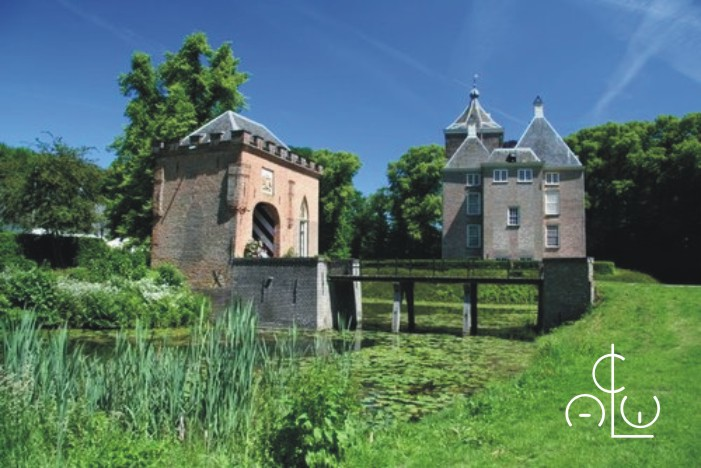
Gatehouse of Kasteel Soelen where C.C. van Asch van Wijck had her atelier 1930–1932

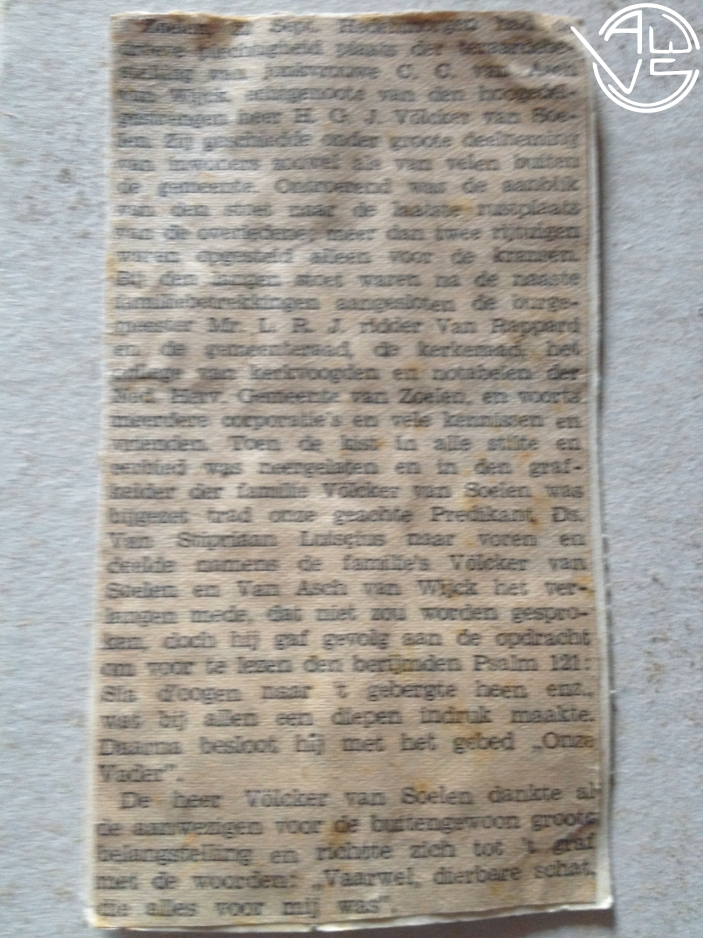
C. C. van Asch van Wijck funeral, clipping from the Tielse Courant, 22 September 1932.

== Works ==
As a sculptor, C. C. van Ash van Wijk's most widely known work is connected with the Glassworks at Leerdam (Leerdam Glasfabriek). In 1929 she proposed her sculpture of a Woman's Mask to Petrus Marinus Cochius director of the Glassworks. The design was approved and went into production. It came in two versions; clear and frosted, some of the glass masks were completed with a wooden base.

It was groundbreaking for the Glassworks, they were adding pure art to their line of functional items, in addition to C. C. van Asch van Wijck, the Glassworks had engaged Lucienne Bloch - later well known for her Murals - who created her glass animals (a lioness, a duck etc.). Her work inspired by earlier Glassworks contributor Steph Uiterwaal's Madonna with Child(1928). There was a bit of a buzz in the Dutch art world over creating and in glass and with industrial means.

C. C. van Asch van Wijck's mask was part of an exposition in "de Olde Munte" in Arnhem and was well received in de Arnhemsche Courant. In 1930 it won a gold medal at the Wereldtentoonstelling voor Kolonien, Zeevaart en Vlaamse Kunst in Antwerpen (Belgium) (World Fair for Colonies, Navigation, and Flemish Art).

C. C. van Ash van Wijk pursued her foray in combining art and industry by partnering with Koninklijk Goedewaagen of Gouda Holland, a manufacturer of earthenware in operation since 1610. She created a flying maiden, "Anunciata", standing in a large round tassa in satinated cream. She signed it with her new monogram adding to her initials the V S of Völcker van Soelen.

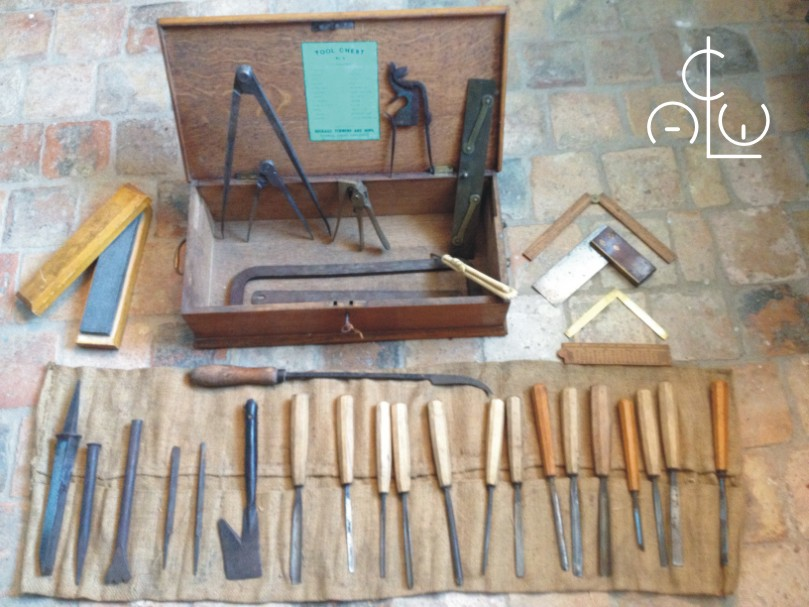
C. C. van Asch van Wijck Tool Box

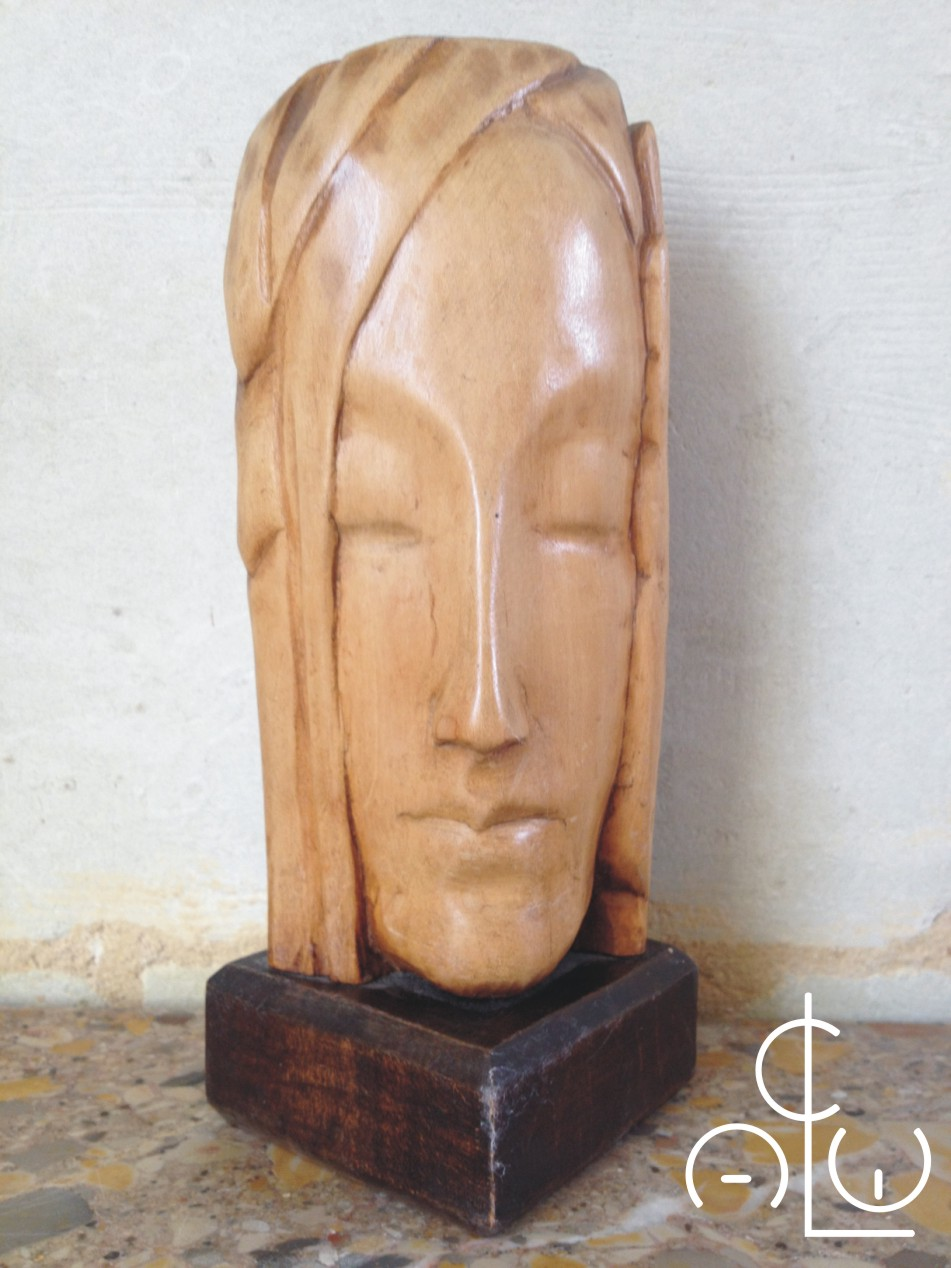
The maquette of the Vrouwenmasker dated 1929, height 20 cm

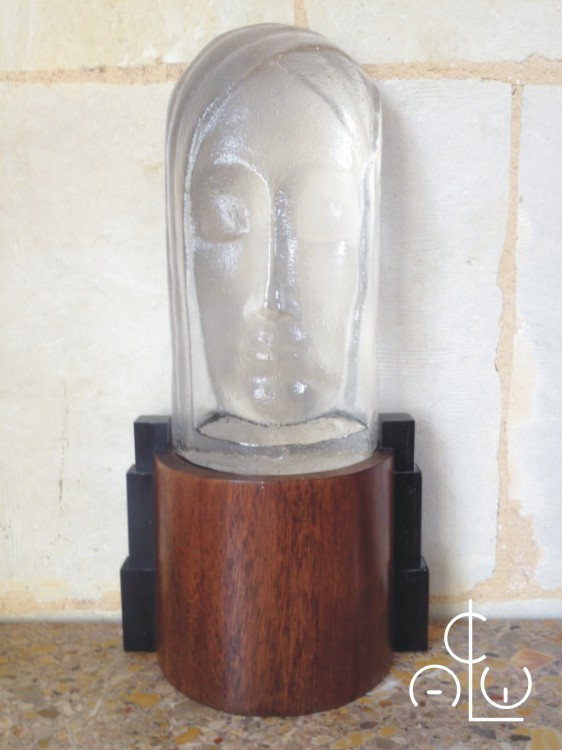
Mask of a woman (clear) by C. C. Asch van Wijck 1929, height is 25.5 cm with pedestal 38.5 cm

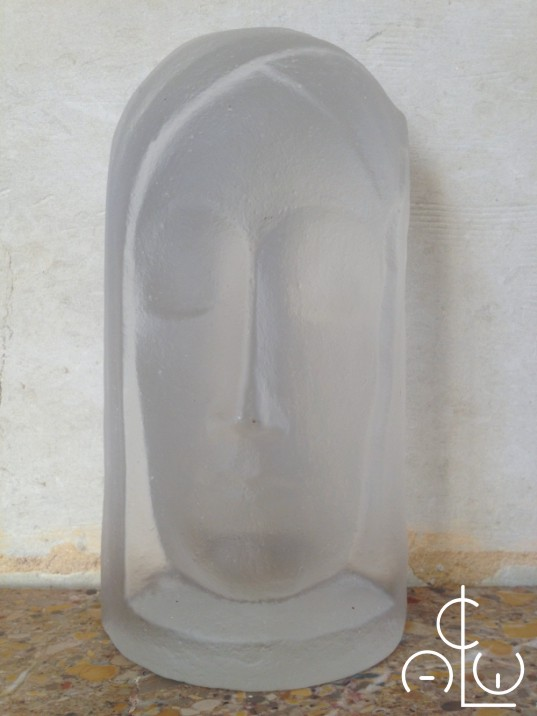
Mask of a woman (frosted) by C. C. Asch van Wijck 1929

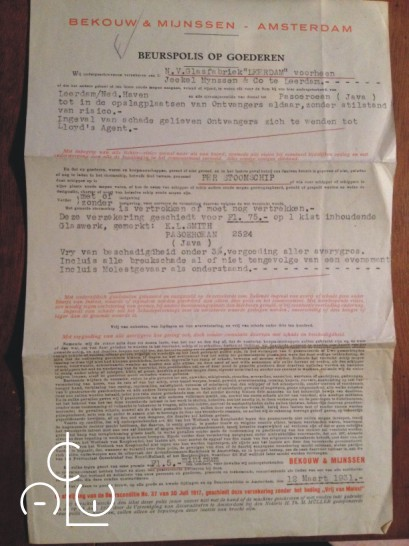
Bill of Insurance on shipment from Glasfabriek Leerdam to Java, Dutch Indies

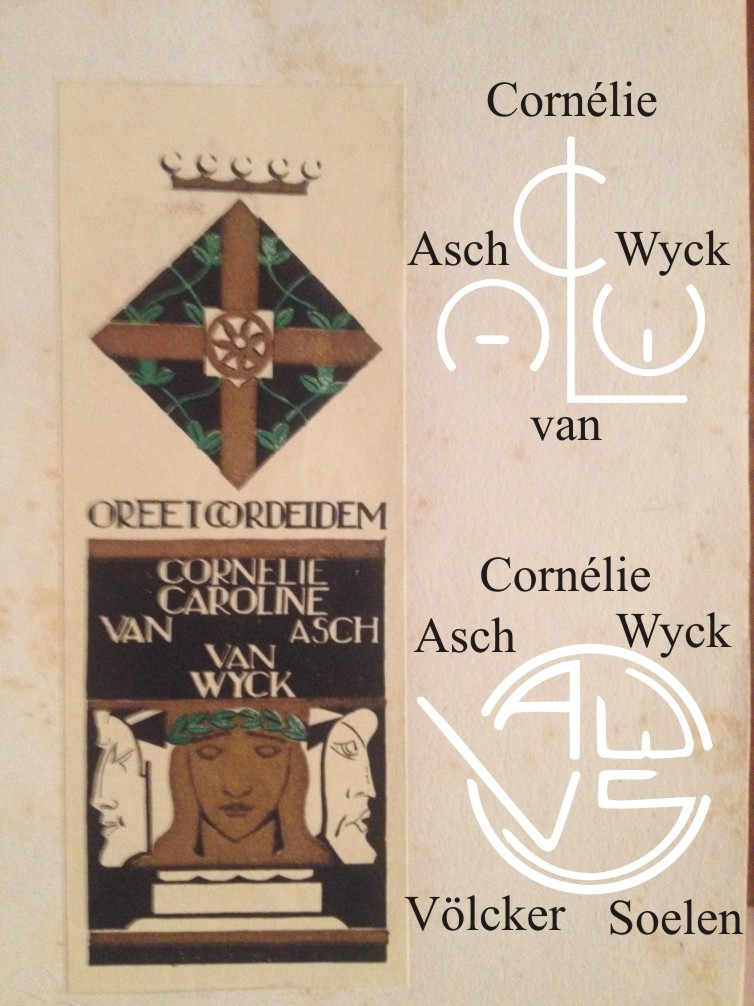
Ex Libris with "modernized" family crest and motto: Ore et Corde Idem (Same of speech and heart) of C. C. van Asch van Wijck.
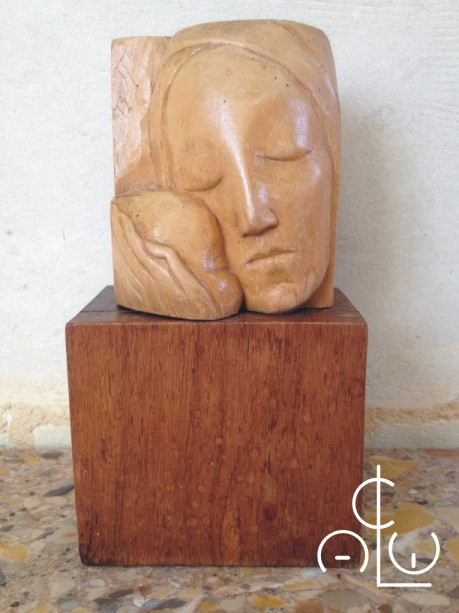
Madonna with child by C. C. van Asch van Wijck 16 cm

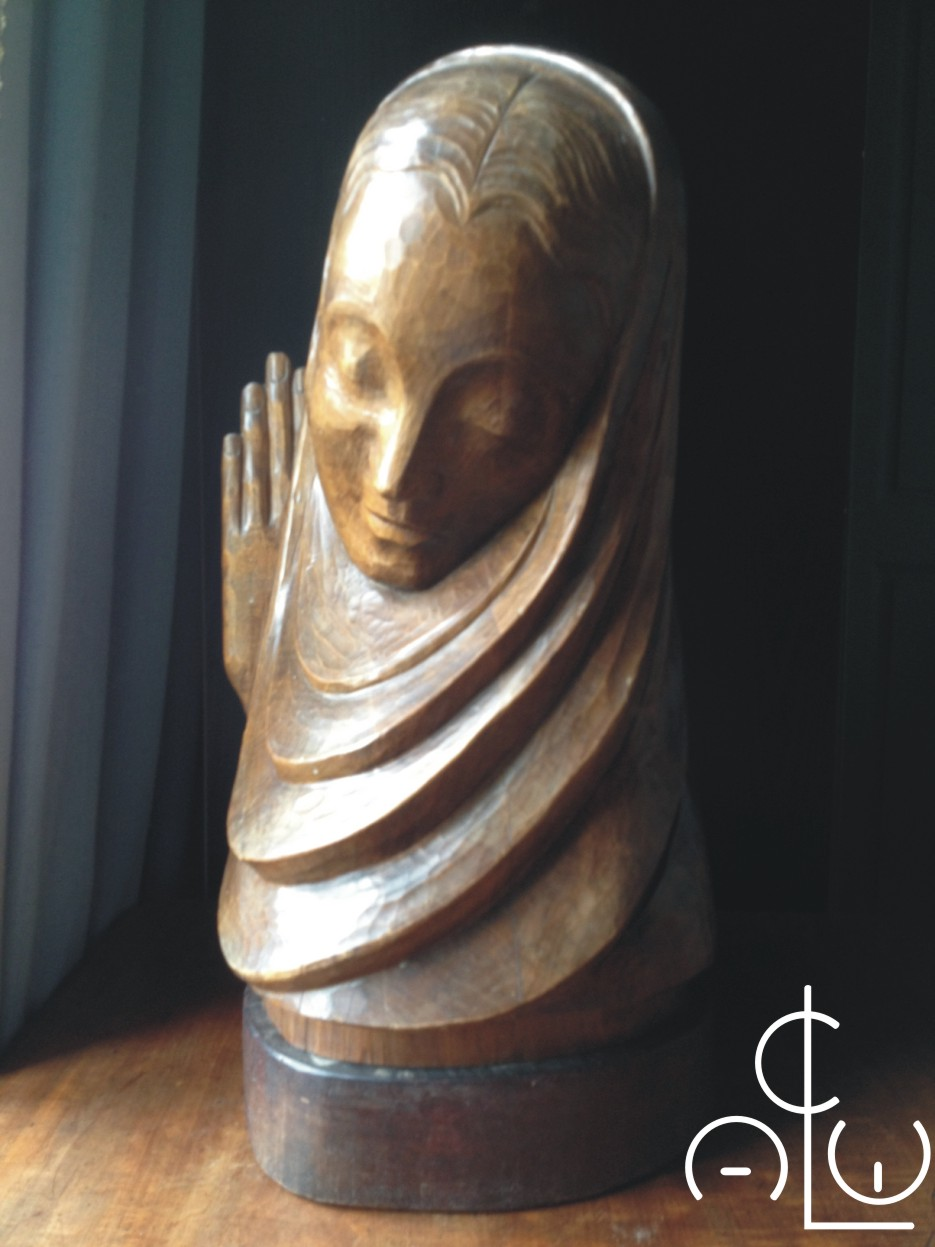
Madonna au Sourire by C. C. van Asch van Wijck, wood sculpture 57 cm

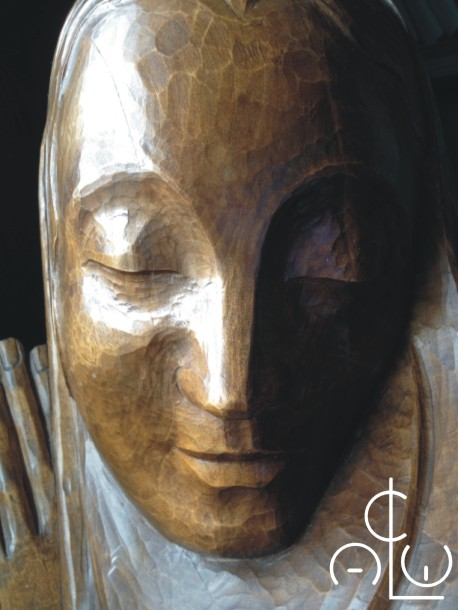
Madonna au Sourire (detail) by C. C. van Asch van Wijck, wood sculpture

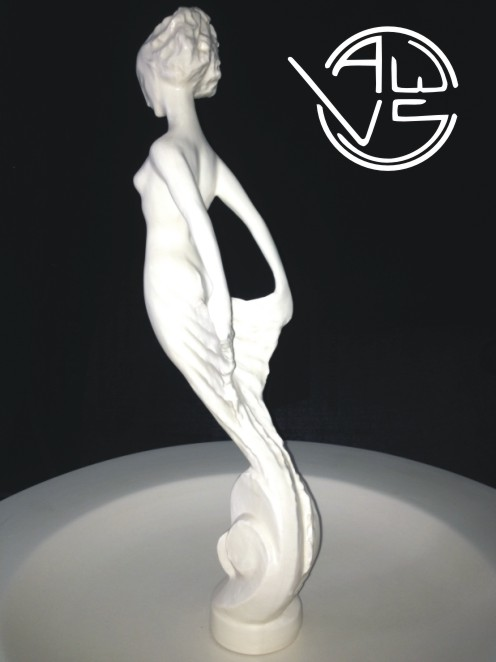
Earthenware "Anunciata" (detail) by C. C. Völcker van Soelen van Asch van Wijck manufactured by Koninklijk Goedewaagen, Gouda Holland, 1931.

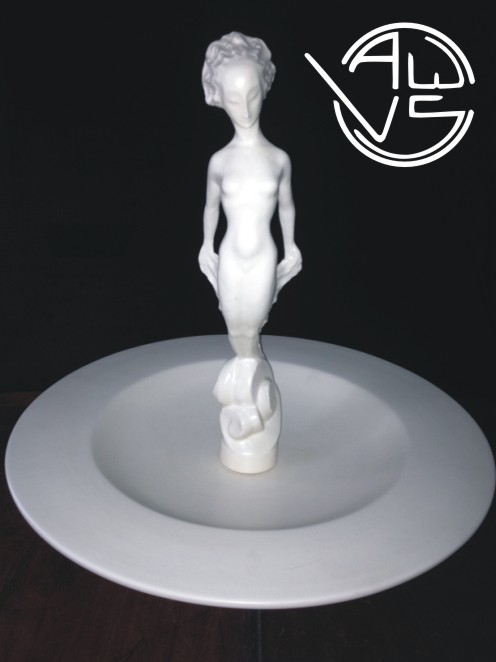
Earthenware "Anunciata" by C. C. Völcker van Soelen van Asch van Wijck manufactured by Koninklijk Goedewaagen, Gouda Holland, 1931.
