= Thijs Udo =

Dutch politician (1954–2025)

Member of the House of Representatives
- In office 25 August 1998 – 15 May 2002

Personal details
- Born: Matthijs Willem Christiaan Udo; 1 May 1954 Zoelen, Netherlands
- Died: 19 January 2025 (aged 70) The Hague, Netherlands
- Party: VVD
- Occupation: Lawyer

Mattijs Willem Christiaan "Thijs" Udo (1 May 1954 – 19 January 2025) was a Dutch politician. A member of the People's Party for Freedom and Democracy, he served in the House of Representatives from 1998 to 2002.

Udo died in The Hague on 19 January 2025, at the age of 70.
