= Zoelen =

- Village
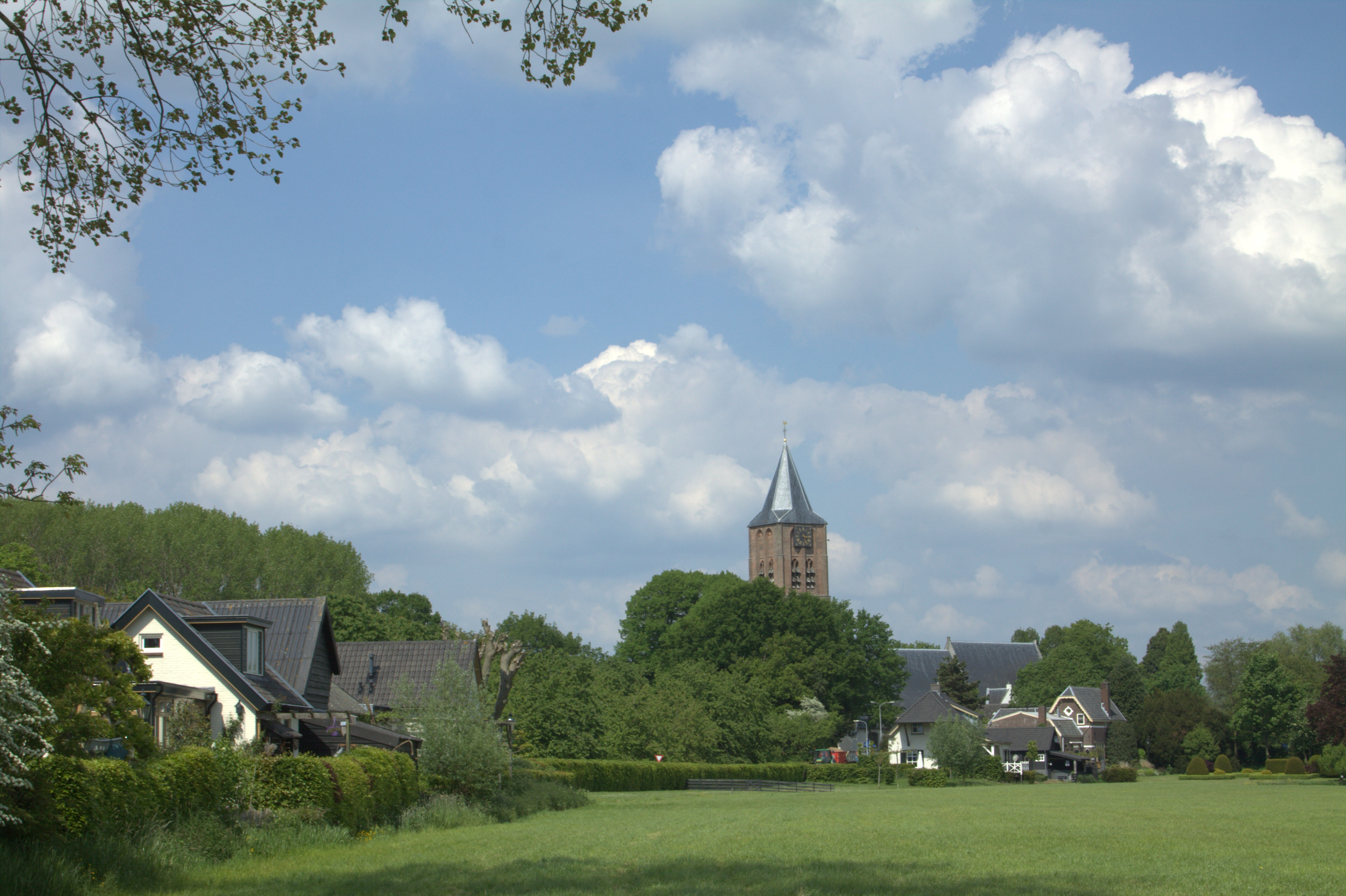
- Zoelen seen from the south

- Coat of arms

- Location in the province of Gelderland Zoelen (Netherlands)
- Coordinates: 51.9102°N 5.4048°E
- Country: Netherlands
- Province: Gelderland
- Municipality: Buren

Area
  - Total: 12.31 km^{2} (4.75 sq mi)
- Elevation: 5 m (16 ft)

Population (2021)
  - Total: 1,540
  - Density: 125/km^{2} (324/sq mi)
- Time zone: UTC+1 (CET)
  - Summer (DST): UTC+2 (CEST)
- Postal code: 4011
- Dialing code: 0344

Zoelen is a village in the Dutch province of Gelderland. It is a part of the municipality of Buren, and lies about 3 km north of Tiel. Castle Zoelen is located near the village.

Zoelen was a separate municipality until 1978, when it was merged with Buren.

== History ==
It was first mentioned in 1139 as Sovlen, and means "settlement along the river Zoel". The village developed as a stretched out settlement along the former river. The Stefanus Church is from 1545, however the tower and church contain 15th century elements. In 1840, it was home to 918 people.

== Castle Soelen ==
Castle Soelen dates from the 13th century. In 1355, it is destroyed by the Duke Edward of Gelre. In 1362, Arnold van Soelen submits to the Duke, and rebuilds the castle. In 1574, the castle is burnt to ground to prevent it falling into Spanish hands. In 1643, it was rebuilt. In 1992, the castle and the 157 hectares (390 acres) park became property of the State who transferred it to Staatsbosbeheer. The castle has been rebuilt as an apartment building.

== Notable people ==
- Johan Gijsbert Verstolk van Soelen (1776-1845), politician
- C. C. van Asch van Wijck (1900-1932), sculptor
- Thijs Udo (1954-2025), politician

== Gallery ==
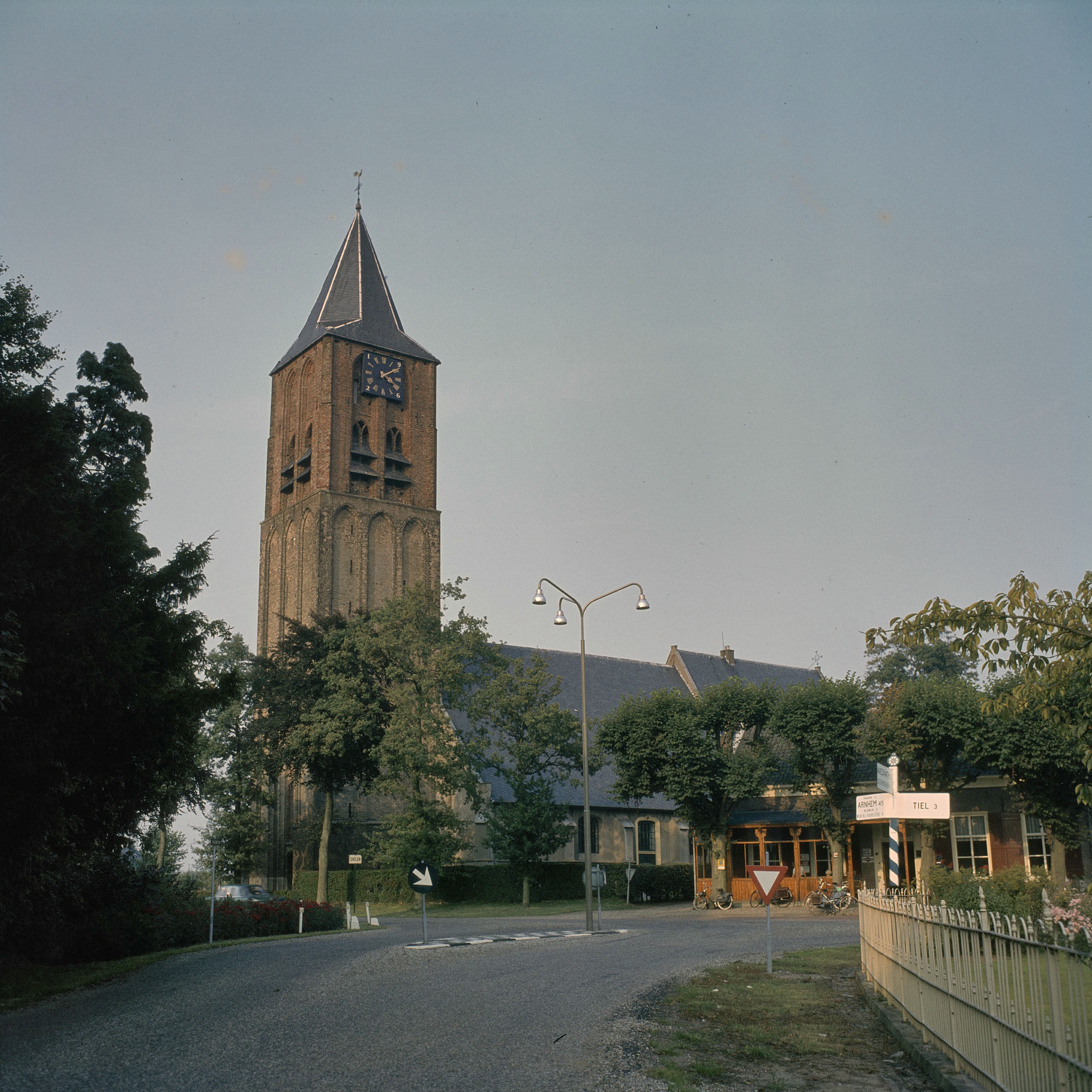
Church of Zoelen

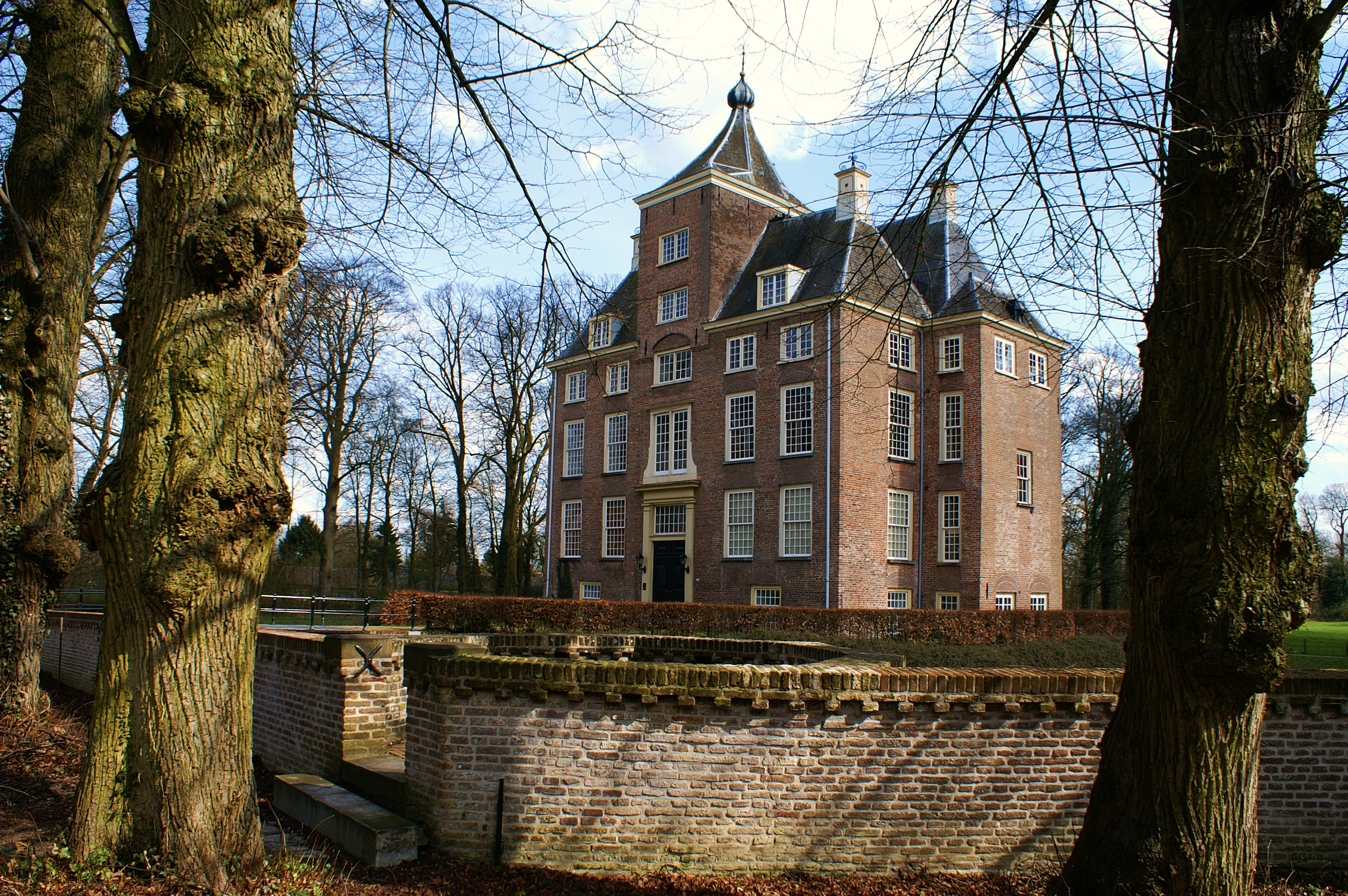
Castle Soelen

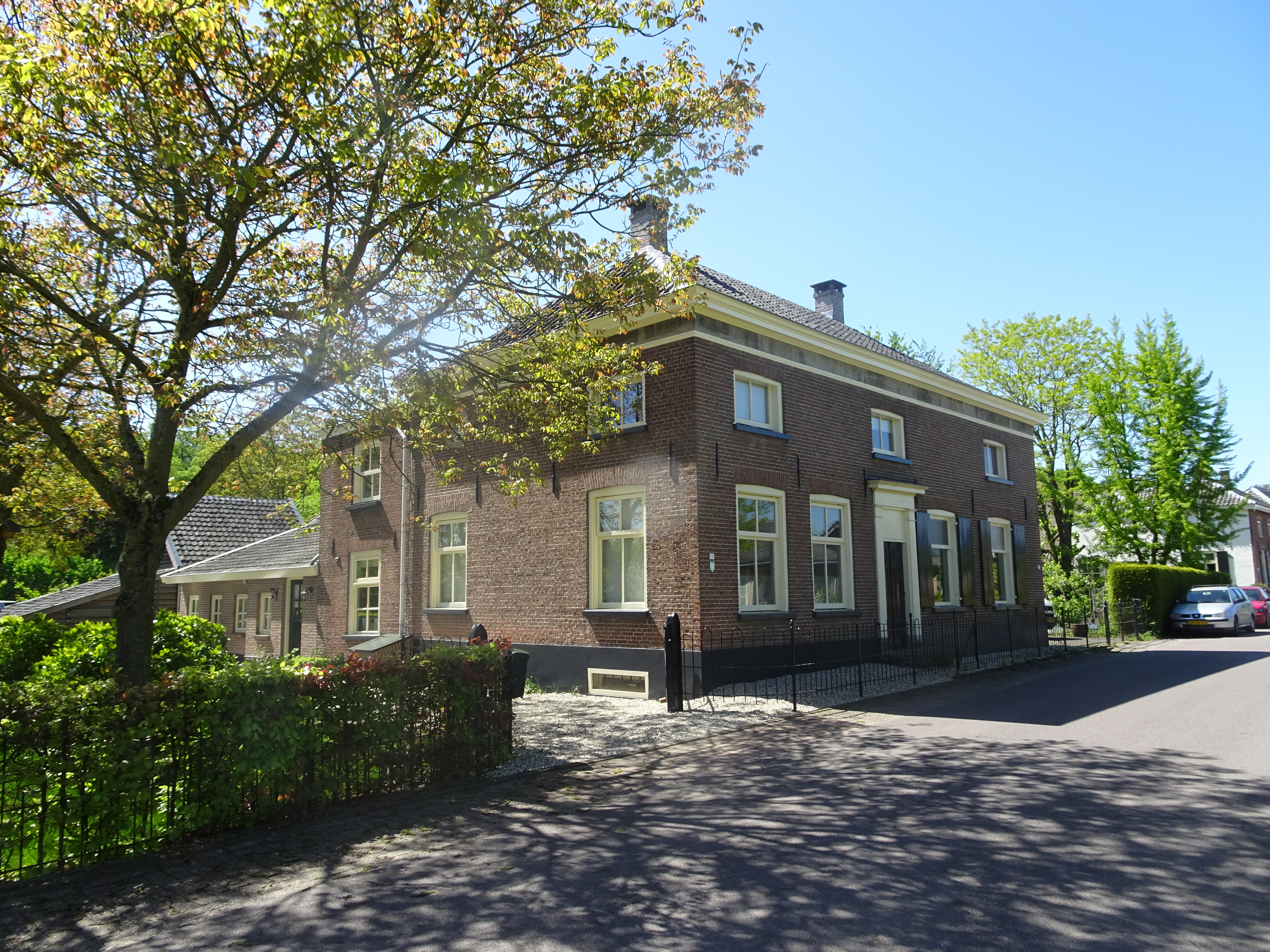
Farm in Zoelen

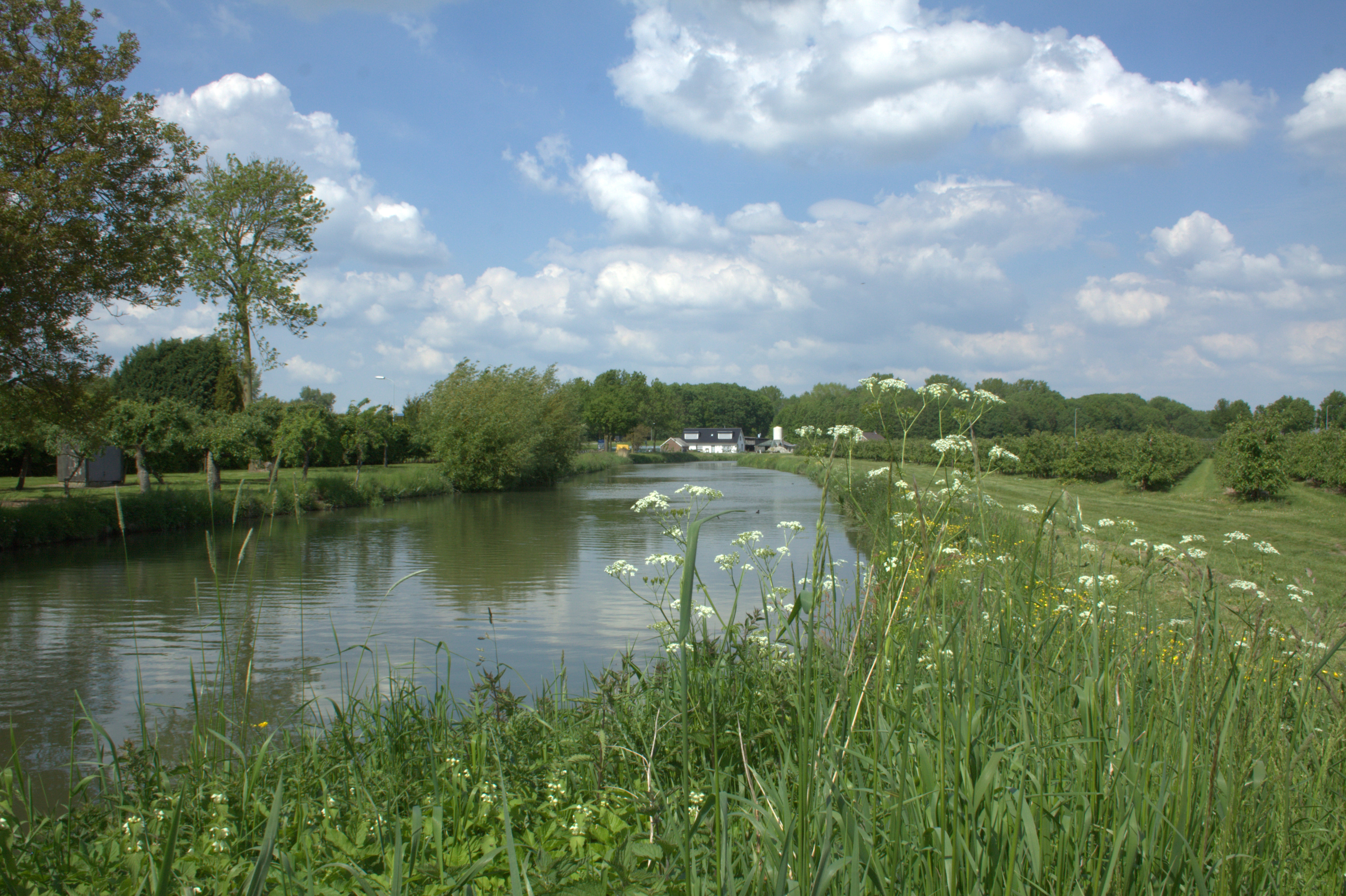
De Linge near Zoelen
