= Unnoticed Art =

Form of performance art

Unnoticed Art is the name of an organisation and a series of initiatives relating to a form of performance art that is executed in a non-theatrical context.

The term 'Unnoticed Art' was originally mentioned by Dutch artist Frans van Lent as a basic concept for the first Unnoticed Art Festival, which took place in Haarlem (The Netherlands) in 2014. The first Unnoticed Art Festival took place over two days, during which time thirty volunteers executed the performance scores created by thirty five artists. An iteration of the first Unnoticed Art Festival was commissioned by Zeppelin University in Friedrichshafen in Germany to form part of their 2014 Sommerfest, the university's principal annual public engagement event. This used a selection of works devised for the Haarlem event. The second Unnoticed Art Festival took place in Nijmegen, 2016. The book Unnoticed Art was published in January, 2015. It contains an artistic statement by Frans van Lent and a catalogue of the Unnoticed Art Festival performances.

The 'Unnoticed Art' concept was further developed into a blog titled UnnoticedArt.com. The purpose of this blog is to present a wide variety of art works that relate to the artistic attitude of the field of Unnoticed Art.

In addition, TheConceptBank.org was initiated as a follow-up from the first Unnoticed Art Festival, as an online free approachable database for performative concepts. Like the festival, TheConceptBank.org is based on the separation of concept creation (the artist) and execution (by visitors of the website). This website was launched in May 2014.

Another derivation of the 'Unnoticed Art' concept, The ParallelShow, is recognised as a series of impromptu performances of occasional collaborations from performance art practitioners. It started on 7 July 2015 as a singular occasion at the Kunsthal in Rotterdam, NL. This first ParallelShow was a cooperation of three Dutch artists: Ieke Trinks, Ienke Kastelein and Frans van Lent.

The concept of The ParallelShow took place unexpectedly at and around public exhibitions in art venues. It was never announced, no invitations are ever sent. Since the first show, The ParallelShow has also been initiated in nine other locations: 23 October 2015: at the Naturalis Biodiversity Center in Leiden, Netherlands; 4 December 2015: at the M-Museum in Leuven, Belgium; 17 January 2016: at the Tate Britain, London, UK; 11 February 2016: at the Art Rotterdam art-fair, Rotterdam, Netherlands; 28 May 2016: at the Archeological Sites, Delphi, Greece; 5 June 2016: at the Huis van Gijn, Dordrecht, Netherlands; 18 September 2016: at the Institut Valencià d’Art Modern (IVAM), Valencia, Spain; 6 November 2016: at the Stasi Museum, Berlin, Germany; 8 January 2017: at the Met Cloisters, in New York City, New York, USA.

The ParallelShow never leaves any physical traces of its occurrence.

The ParallelShow book was published from Jap Sam Books, in The Netherlands, in March 2018.
