= Landdrost =

Official with local jurisdiction (Netherlands and Cape Colony)

Landdrost (Dutch: [ˈlɑndrɔst]) was the title of various officials with local jurisdiction in the Netherlands and a number of former territories in the Dutch Empire. The term is a Dutch compound, with land meaning "region" and drost, from Middle Dutch drossāte (droes-state, bloke-castle, state-holder) which originally referred to a lord’s chief retainer (who later became the medieval seneschal or steward), equivalent to:

- an English reeve or steward;
- a Low German Drost(e) of Northern Germany (cognate with German Truchsess); or
- German Meier (from Latin majordomus).

== Feudal era ==
Originally, a drost in the Low Countries – where various titles were in use for similar offices – was essentially a steward or seneschal under the local lord, exercising various functions depending on the endlessly varied local customary law, e.g. tax collection, policing, prosecution, and carrying out sentences.

In many Lower Rhenish and Westphalian and Lower Saxon estates of the Holy Roman Empire the term Landdrost or Drost(e) described the chief executive official of a military, jurisdictional and/or police ambit, representing his lord-paramount of the territory, therefore often appearing with the affix 'land-'. Among the many territories using the term were the Prince-Archbishopric of Bremen, the Prince-Bishopric of Hildesheim, the County of Mark, and the Duchy of Mecklenburg.

== South Africa ==
The office was also introduced in the Dutch colony established at the Cape of Good Hope. The first was appointed in Stellenbosch, and further landdrosts were appointed as new districts were proclaimed: Drakenstein (Paarl), Swartland (Malmesbury), Tulbagh, Swellendam, Graaff-Reinet and Uitenhage.

Under the British, new districts were created at George and Grahamstown (Albany district), while Lord Charles Somerset moved the seat of the Tulbagh district to the new town of Worcester.

It came to more gubernatorial significance in some of the Boer polities that seceded after the British took over the colony, notably:

- Graaff-Reinet had only one "national" landdrost (appointed by the revolutionary régime that regarded itself as being part of the [French revolutionary] Dutch republic), 6 February 1795 – 22 August 1796: Friedrich Carl David Gerotz (1739–1828)
- The Republic of Natalia appointed three landdrosts: one in Pietermaritzburg (Jacobus Nicolaas Boshof), one in Durban (an English trader) and one in Winburg.
- The Utrecht Republic had three consecutive landdrosts:
  - 1852 – 1855: Andreas Theodorus Spies (1800–1889), who was already in office before the settlement declared itself a republic
  - 1855 – February 1856: J.C. Steyn
  - February 1856 – 8 May 1858: Andreas Theodorus Spies (2nd time)

A similar gubernatorial role in other Boer polities was played by officials styled Kaptyn ('captain', in the original sense of Headman).

=== Civil Commissioners, magistrates ===
In the Cape Colony, an ordinance passed in 1827 abolished the old Dutch "landdrost" and courts of heemraden, instead substituting British-type resident magistrates, who would act only in English. Most of the Cape’s magistrates were also civil commissioners, in charge of civil divisions – the Cape Peninsula was a single division (the Cape division) with three magisterial districts: Cape Town, Wynberg and Simon’s Town.

In the Boer republics, each proclaimed district had a landdrost. With the annexation of the South African Republic and the Orange Free State during the Boer War, the office fell away, the landdrosts being replaced by British-style magistrates.

Since 1958, "landdros" has been used as the Afrikaans term for a magistrate.

== Netherlands under Napoleonic rule ==
- Drenthe province, after Administrators (16 February 1795 – 8 May 1807), had two Landdrosts:
  - 8 May 1807 – 1 January 1810 Petrus Hofstede (b. 1755 – d. 1839)
  - 1 January 1810 – 1811 Jan Adriaan, baron van Zuylen van Nijevelt (b. 1776 – d. 1840); next it had Governors
- Friesland (Dutch Frisia), after several Administrators, had one Landdrost: 8 May 1807 – February 1811 Regnerus Livius van Andringa de Kempenaer (b. 1752 – d. 1813), next a Prefect (1811 – 13 December 1813 January: Johan Gijsbert Verstolk van Soelen), then Commissarissen-generaal
- Gelderland, after Administrators (16 February 1795 – 8 May 1807), had Landdrosts:
  - 8 May 1807 – 14 November 1807: Gerrit Willem Joseph, baron van Lamswerde (b. 1758 – d. 1837)
  - 14 November 1807 – 1 January 1811 Johan Arend de Vos van Steenwijk (b. 1746 – d. 1813)
  - 1810 – February 1811 Verstolk van Soelen; next a Prefect (February 1811 – 1 December 1813 Regnerus Livius van Andringa de Kempenaer (b. 1752 – d. 1813), afterwards Governors
- Groningen province, after Administrators (16 February 1795 – 8 May 1807), had one Landdrost: 8 May 1807 – 1 January 1811 Hendrik Ludolf Wichers (b. 1747 – d. 1840), next two Prefects of Ems-Occidental, then Governors
- North Brabant (Noord-Brabant), after Administrators (16 February 1795 – 8 May 1807) had one Landdrost, 8 May 1807 – 1810: Paul Emanuel Anthony de la Court (b. 1760 – d. 1848), next a Prefect of Bouches-du-Rhin department (9 July 1810 – 1814 Nicolas, baron Frémin de Beaumont), then Governors
- Holland (only 1840 divided in the present two provinces North – and South Holland) as such never had a Landdrost; however, while the Amstel, Delf and Texel départements were only under Commissioners, these temporary fractions did:
  - Amstelland, formed in 1807 from Amsterdam and northern part of département Holland, until it was on 9 July 1810 merged with Utrecht into French département Zuyderzee, had one Landdrost, 1807 – 9 July 1810: Jan van Styrum (b. 1757 – d. 1829)
  - Maasland, in 1807 a département formed from The Hague and southern parts of département of Holland, had a single Landdrost, May 1807 – November 1807: Jacob Abraham de Mist (b. 1749 – d. 1823), then Prefects (continuing when on 9 July 1810 renamed French département Bouches-de-la-Meuse) until it was in 1814 abolished
- Overijssel, after Administrators (16 February 1795 – 1 January 1810) had one Landdrost, 1 January 1810 – 1811: Petrus Hofstede (b. 1755 – d. 1839), then two Prefects of Bouches-de-l'Yssel (1811–1814)
- Utrecht province, after Administrators (16 February 1795 – 1806) had one Landdrost, 1806 – 1811: Jan Hendrik van Lynden (b. 1765 – d. 1854), then Governors
- Zeeland, after Administrators (17 February 1795 – 8 May 1807) had two Landdrosts:
  - 8 May 1807 – 1809 Abraham van Doorn (b. 1760 – d. 1814)
  - 8 September 1809 – 16 March 1810 François Ermerins (b. 1753 – d. 1840); next two Prefects of Bouches-de-l'Escaut (9 July 1810 – 1814), then Governors
- Meanwhile Dutch Limburg (which had had one Drossard as Chief Justice, 1754 – 1794: Philippe Joseph Dieudonné, graaf van Woestenraedt) was simply annexed to France as one of the 'Belgian' provinces, département Meuse-Inférieure ('Lower Maas (=Meuse)')

== In 19th century Hanover ==
In 1823 the Kingdom of Hanover, then in personal union with the UK, adopted the term for its administrative subdivisions called Landdrostei[en] (sg.[pl.]), each presided over by a Landdrost, with those terms then translated into English as High-Bailiwick and High-Bailiff. On 1 April 1885 the terms were replaced in Hanover by the terms Regierungsbezirk (governorate) and Regierungspräsident (governor).

== Post-World War II Dutch-occupied Germany ==
After World War II, the old landdrost title was re-used for two extraordinary jurisdictions within the Dutch Occupation Zone in Germany. On 22 March 1949, the Allies agreed to let the Netherlands occupy and annex some German border territories. These included the municipalities of Havert, Hillensberg, Millen, Süsterseel, Tüddern (Dutch: Tudderen), Wehr, parts of Höngen, Gangelt, Schumm, Saeffelen as well as Elten and Hoch-Elten.

The Dutch annexation effectively started on 23 April that year, with the following two jurisdictions declared:

- Landdrost of Tudderen (German: Tüddern) (directly subordinated to the Dutch government up to September 1951, then to the Governor of Dutch Limburg province): 1949 – 1963 Hubert M.J. Dassen
- two Landdrosten of Elten (subordinated to the Dutch government up to September 1951, then to the Commissioner of the Queen -i.e. Governor- for Gelderland)
  - April 1949 – October 1961: Dr. Adriaan Blaauboer (b. 1906 – d. 1961)
  - October 1961 – August 1963: Baron Hans Georg Inundat van Tuyll van Serooskerken (b. 1917 – d. 1988)

This situation lasted until 11 August 1963, when all territories were returned except for minor frontier adjustments, following German agreement to pay war compensation.

== Openbaar Lichaam Zuidelijke IJsselmeerpolders ==
After the creation of the Zuidelijke IJsselmeerpolders, now part of the province of Flevoland, the newly claimed area was governed by the landdrost of the Openbaar Lichaam Zuidelijke IJsselmeerpolders (Public Body of the Southern IJsselmeer Polders) until it was partitioned into municipalities.
