= Henrik Brenkman =

Dutch jurist

Henrik Brenkman (bapt. 11 December 1681, Rotterdam – 1736, Culemborg) was a Dutch jurist and colleague of Cornelius Bynkershoek.

He is best known for his work on the textual history of the Corpus iuris civilis. His main work, the Historia Pandectarum, concerned with the Florentine Manuscript, remains of significance today.
