= Johan Gijsbert Verstolk van Soelen =

Dutch politician

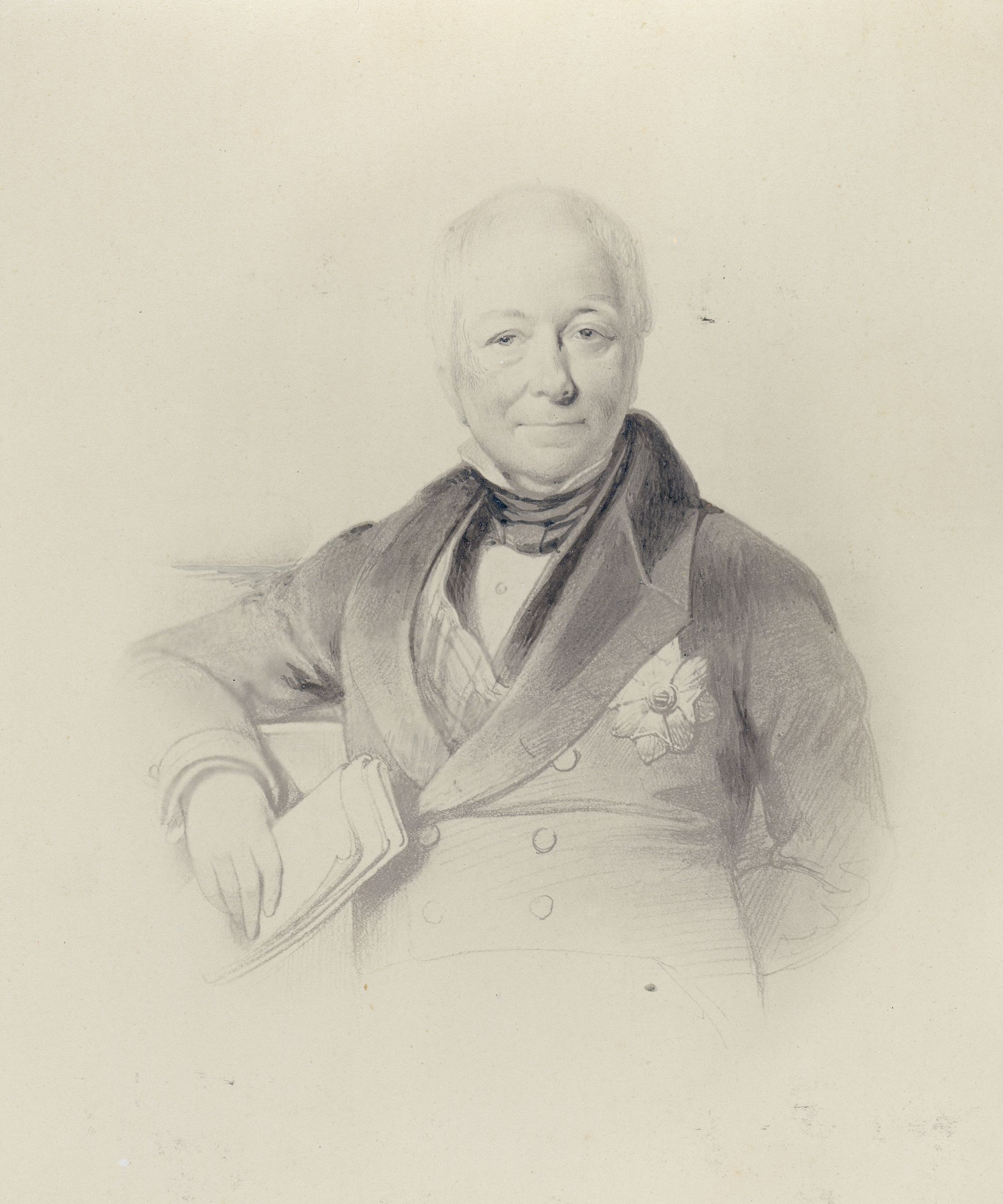
- Joan Gijsbert Verstolk van Soelen, portrayed by Lodewijk Anthony Vintcent

Minister of Foreign Affairs of the Netherlands
- In office 1 December 1825 – 13 September 1841
- Monarchs: Willem I (1825-1840); Willem II (1840-1841)
- Preceded by: Patrice de Coninck
- Succeeded by: Hugo van Zuylen van Nijevelt

Personal details
- Born: Johan Gijsbert Verstolk van Soelen; 16 March 1776 Rotterdam, Dutch Republic
- Died: 3 November 1845 (aged 69) Zoelen, Netherlands
- Education: University of Göttingen
- Occupation: Politician; civil servant; diplomat

Johan Gijsbert Verstolk van Soelen (16 March 1776 – 3 November 1845) was a Dutch politician. Between 1825 and 1841 he served as Minister of Foreign Affairs.

== Biography ==
Verstolk van Soelen came from a family of patricians from Rotterdam. He studied law at the University of Göttingen, where he followed lectures from Georg Friedrich von Martens. At the University of Kiel he studied constitutional and international law. Within the Kingdom of Holland he held the office of Landdrost of the Department Guelderland. After the Incorporation of the kingdom into the First French Empire he became prefect of Frise. He switched this office with Regnerus Livius van Andringa de Kempenaer.

He largely endorsed the ideas behind Napoleonic governance, but he advocated a more moderate approach. During his time in Frise, he was not hated by the people and he was able to meet the minimum requirements for measures like the unpopular Napoleonic conscription. In cases of popular resistance, he did not hesitate to call upon the gendarmerie or the military. After the arrival of the Russian cossacks in November 1813, he resigned from his position as prefect.

After the liberation of the Netherlands, Verstolk first held the office of commissaris-generaal in the Southern Netherlands. After that he became ambassador for the Netherlands in Saint Petersburg. He held this office from 1815 until 1823. In 1825 he gained the office of Minister of Foreign Affairs. Together with Cornelis Felix van Maanen, he was one of the longest-serving ministers under King Willem I. At the behest of this king, he completed a comprehensive report on the international orientation of the kingdom in 1829. He believed that the Netherlands should pursue an active policy of independence.

Willem II succeeded his father as king in 1840 and began pursuing a more liberal course. Verstolk had great difficulty with this course, and in 1842, angrily and disappointedly, he resigned.

== Castle ==
Verstolk inherited from his father Soelen Castle in Zoelen. He commissioned Jan David Zocher to redesign the castle garden. Zocher may also have designed his tomb.

== Bibliography ==
- Burg, Martijn van der (2021). Napoleonic Governance in the Netherlands and Northwest Germany Conquest, Incorporation, and Integration. Cham: Palgrave Macmillan. ISBN 978-3-030-66658-3.
- Koch, Jeroen (2013). Koning Willem I: 1772-1843. Amsterdam: Uitgeverij Boom. ISBN 9789461051844.
- Sas, Niek van (2024). De wentelende eeuw: De geschiedenis van Nederland, 1795-1914. Amsterdam: Prometheus. ISBN 9789035127777.
- Uitterhoeve, Wilfried (2013). 1813 – Haagse bluf: De korte chaos van de vrijwording. Nijmegen: Uitgeverij Vantilt.
- Zanten, Jeroen van (2013). Koning Willem II: 1792-1849. Amsterdam: Uitgeverij Boom. ISBN 9789461051851.
