= Arthur Benjamins =

Dutch artist

- Born: June 22, 1953 (age 73); Rotterdam, Netherlands
- Known for: Painting, writing
- Website: www.1pilgrimstudio.com

Arthur Benjamins (born June 22, 1953) is a Dutch artist known for his evolution from photorealistic motorsport paintings to abstract iconography, particularly in the revival of Neoplasticism. His work has been exhibited internationally, including notable appearances at automotive events and art expos in the United States.

== Early life and background ==
Arthur Benjamins was born in Rotterdam, Netherlands, into a lineage of artists. His great-grand uncle, Jacques Jacob Arend, has paintings housed in the Museum Boijmans Van Beuningen in Rotterdam.

During his early years, he lived in Rhodesia (now Zimbabwe) before returning to Rotterdam in 1963. His exposure to industrial landscapes, ships, and heavy machinery along the Maas River influenced his later interest in mechanics, precision, and movement, themes that would later define his motorsport and aviation artwork "Arthur Benjamins: Artist Biography". Remodern Review.

== Artistic career ==
=== Photorealism and motorsport art (1980s–1990s) ===
In the 1980s, Benjamins gained recognition in the United Kingdom for his photo-realistic paintings of motorsports, aviation, and record-breaking events. He pioneered the use of enamel-based paints in fine art, a technique that set his work apart and was later adopted by other motorsport artists. His paintings appeared in racing publications, promotional materials, and book covers.

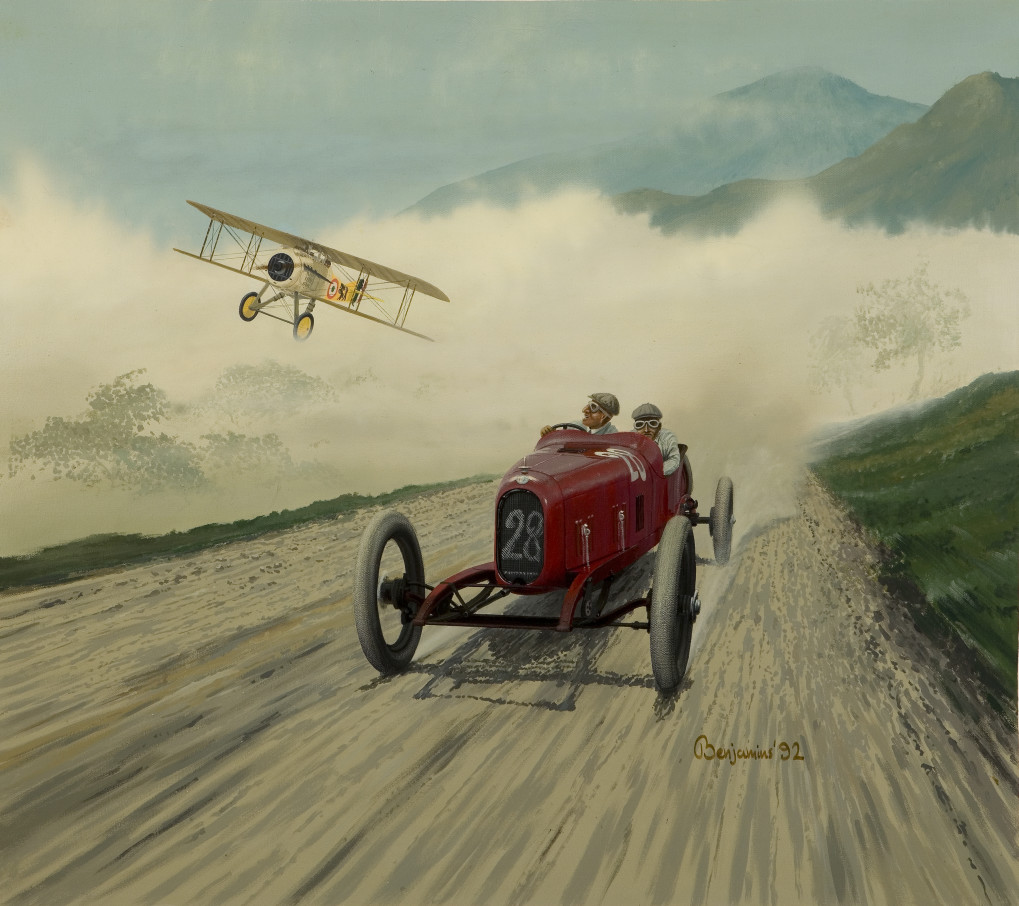
An Ethereal Encounter

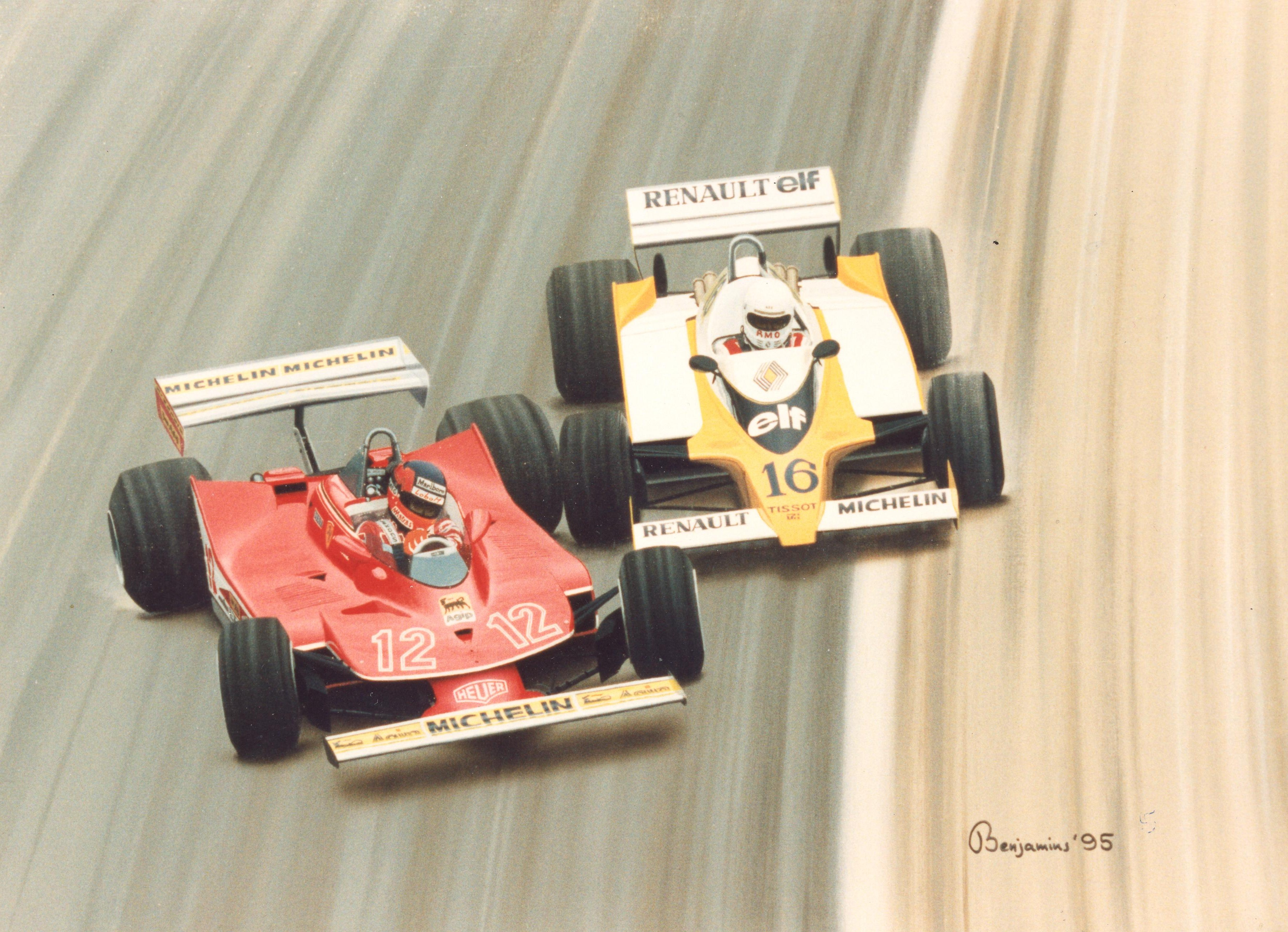
No Surrender

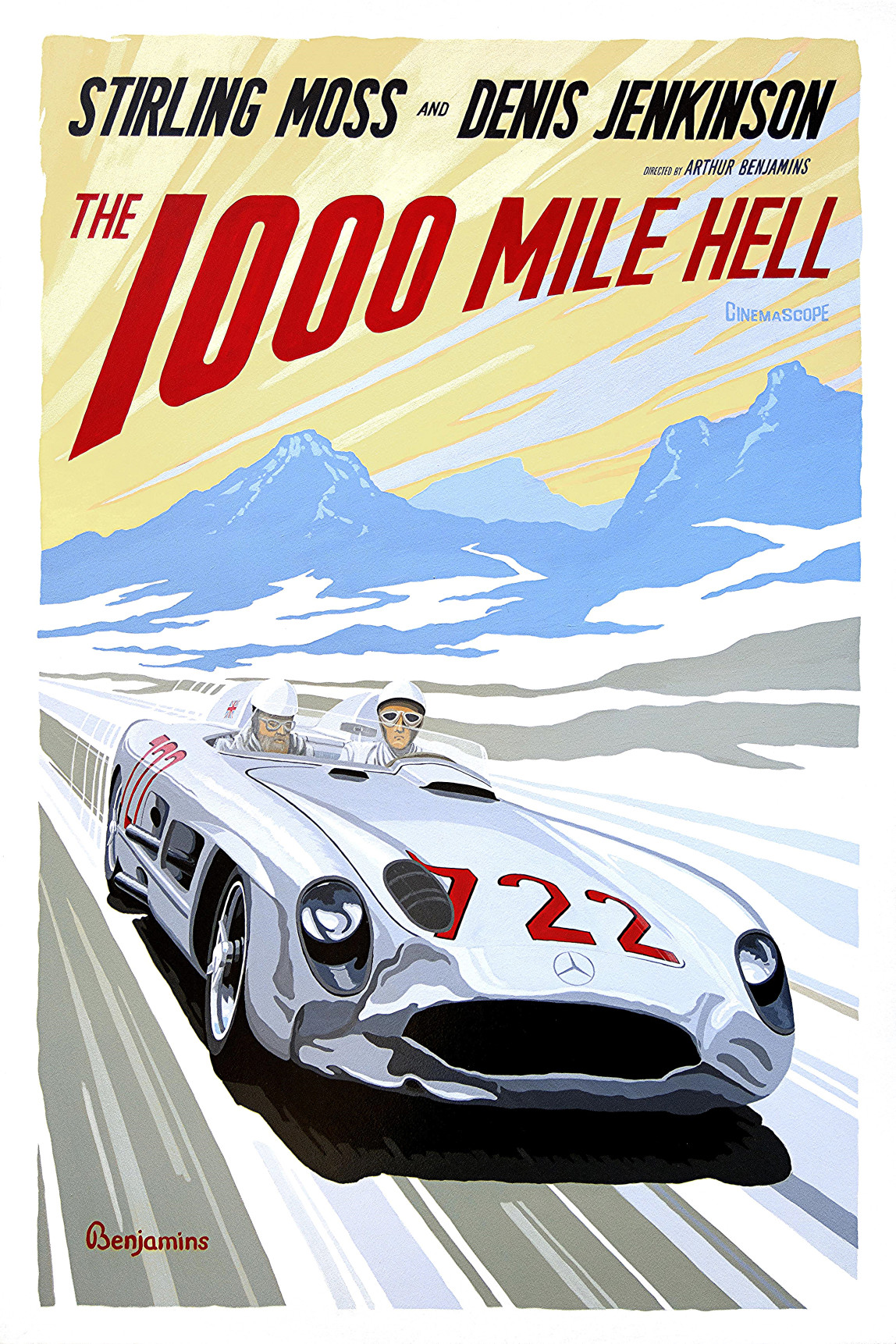
The 1000 Mile Hell

=== Transition to abstract art and neoplasticism (2000s–Present) ===
By the early 2000s, Benjamins moved away from photorealism, exploring abstraction with a focus on structured form, bold contrasts, and symbolic representation. His new style, which he terms "abstract iconography," integrates influences from neoplasticism, surrealism, and pop art.

In 2014, he relocated to Phoenix, Arizona, expanding his thematic series, including:

- The Desert Series – inspired by the colors and textures of the Sonoran Desert.
- The American Series – integrating patriotic symbols and abstracted cultural elements.

His work has been showcased at major art exhibitions, including the Arizona Fine Art Expo, and has gained recognition in contemporary abstract art circles.

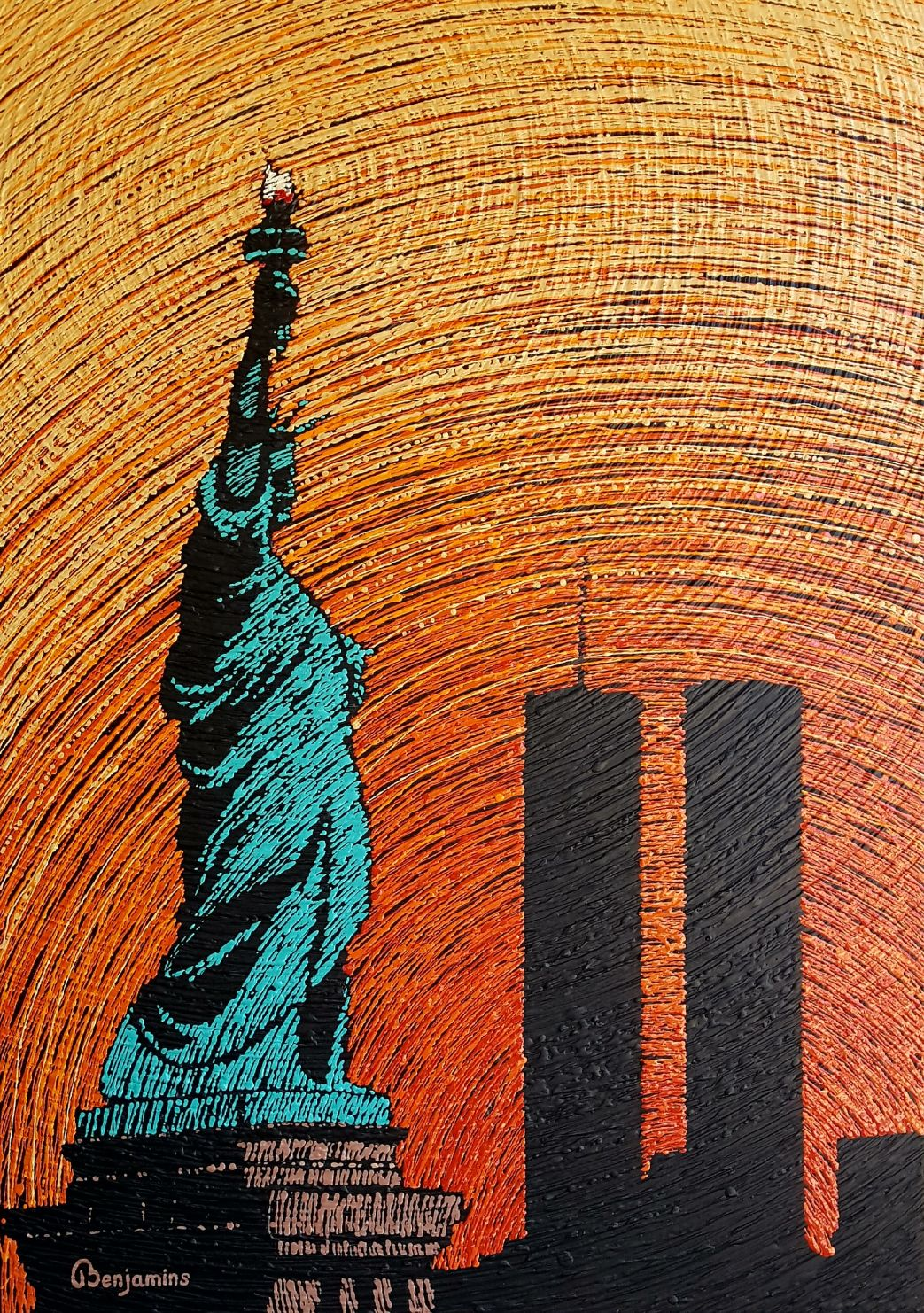
Give Me Your Tired

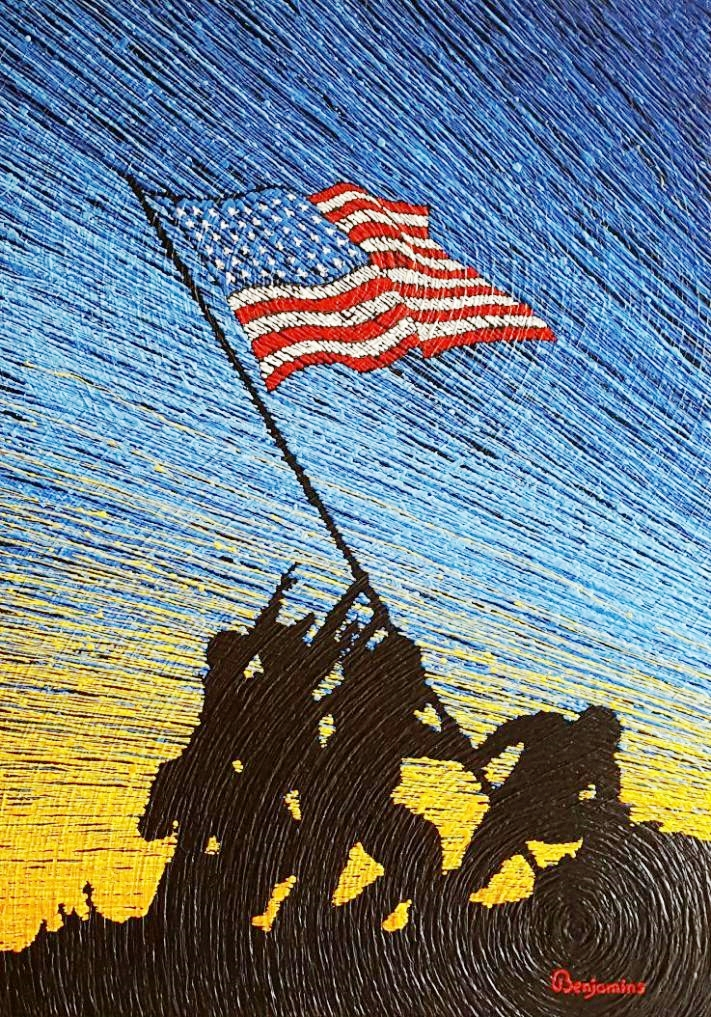
Flags of Our Fathers

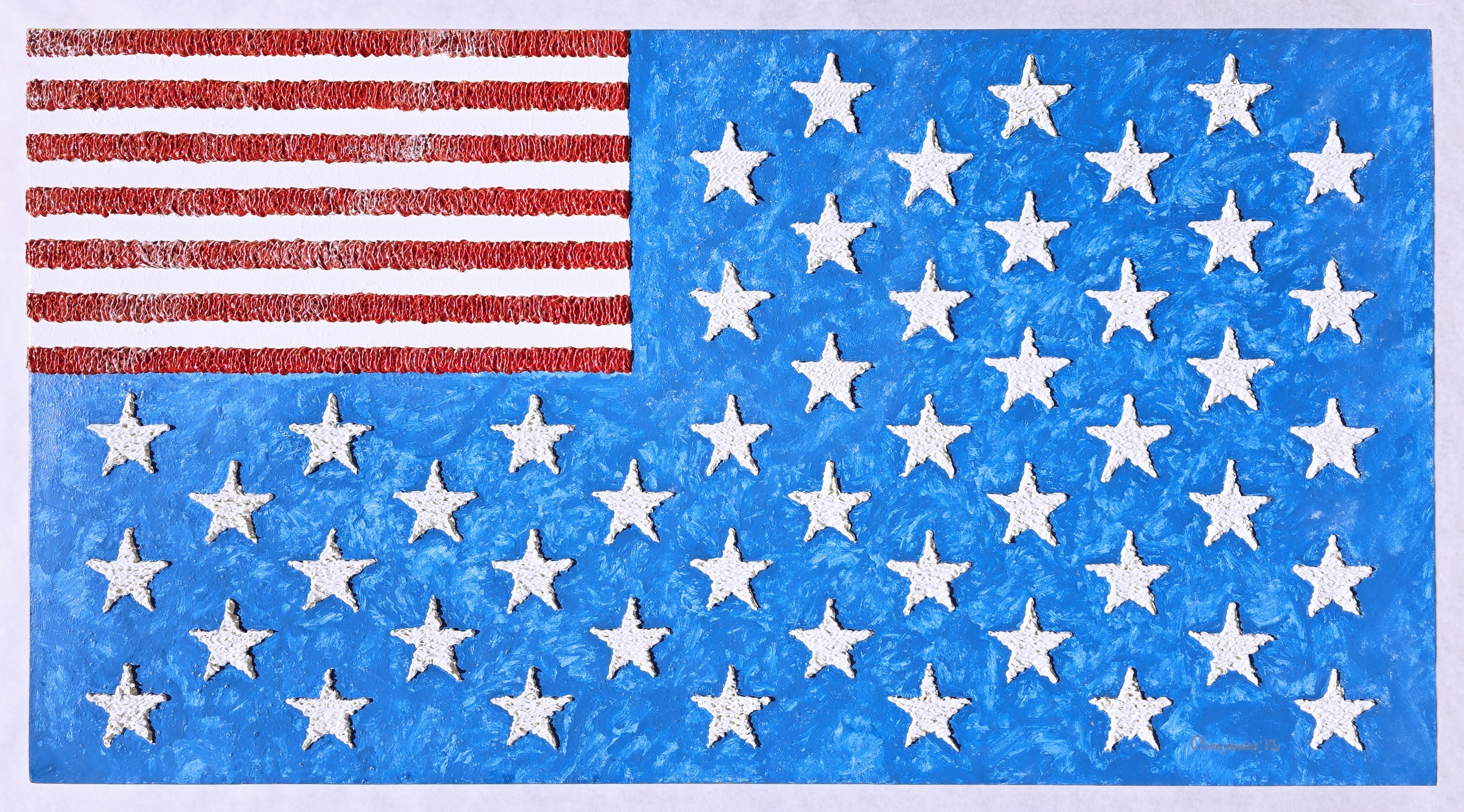

== Exhibitions and recognition ==
Benjamins has exhibited his work at the Barrett-Jackson automotive auctions, showcasing his motorsport and automotive-inspired pieces. He participated in the 2014 Barrett-Jackson Scottsdale show and has continued to feature his art in subsequent events.

In addition to Barrett-Jackson, Benjamins has been a regular participant in the Arizona Fine Art Expo, displaying both his abstract and Neoplasticism-inspired artworks.

== Other endeavors ==
=== Design and inventions ===
Benjamins holds eight patents in product and industrial design, reflecting his technical and mechanical interests.

=== Writing ===
He is the author of To Die Fighting, a biography of his father, detailing his experiences during World War II and his later years in Africa.

== Influence and legacy ==
Benjamins' artistic evolution from technical photorealism to structured abstraction represents a continuous reinvention of style. His revitalization of neoplasticism and his use of enamel paints in motorsport art have contributed to modern interpretations of precision-driven abstraction.

His work continues to be exhibited, published, and collected, positioning him as an artist who bridges the worlds of representational and conceptual art.

== Motorsport artist ==
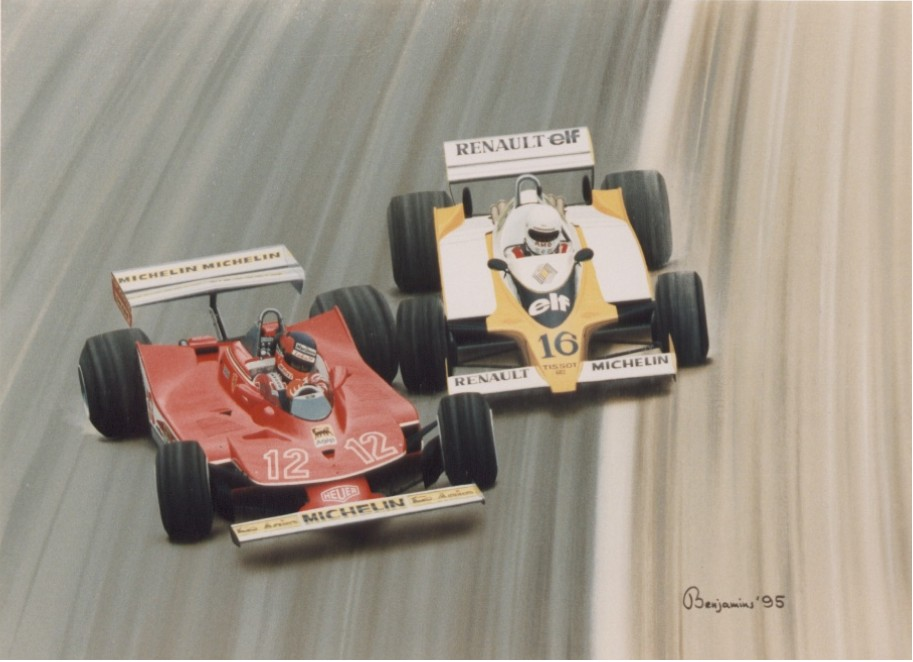
No Surrender by Arthur Benjamins

Benjamins comes from a lineage of artists. the paintings of his great grand uncle Jacques Jacob Arend (1908–1943) can be found in the museum Boijmans van Beuningen in Rotterdam. His grandfather created a new style of advertising that formed the bedrock of modern illustrative adverts. Benjamins' early childhood was spent in Rhodesia (Zimbabwe) and from there he moved to Rotterdam in 1963 where, living on the busy Maas River, he began to develop his technical interest for the ships, dry docks and cranes. At a Ford showroom in Rotterdam in 1973, Arthur met the future Indianapolis 500 winner, Arie Luyendyk and reigning Formula One champion, Jackie Stewart who gave him encouragement and advice.

In 1974 Benjamins left for the UK. In the mid-1970s he became a BRSCC motor racing marshal, attending many races at his local track, Brands Hatch in Kent. This enabled him to observe first-hand many drivers like James Hunt, Nelson Piquet, and Nigel Mansell in the early part of their careers prior to becoming Grand Prix drivers and World champions.

In the early 1980s, Benjamins' evocation of key moments in motorsport much publicity through articles in motor racing magazines as Autosport, Classic and Sportscar, "Motorsport", and Classic Boat Benjamins' technique is different from other artists insofar in that he eschews the use of 'traditional' paints, preferring the far more trickier enamel paint.

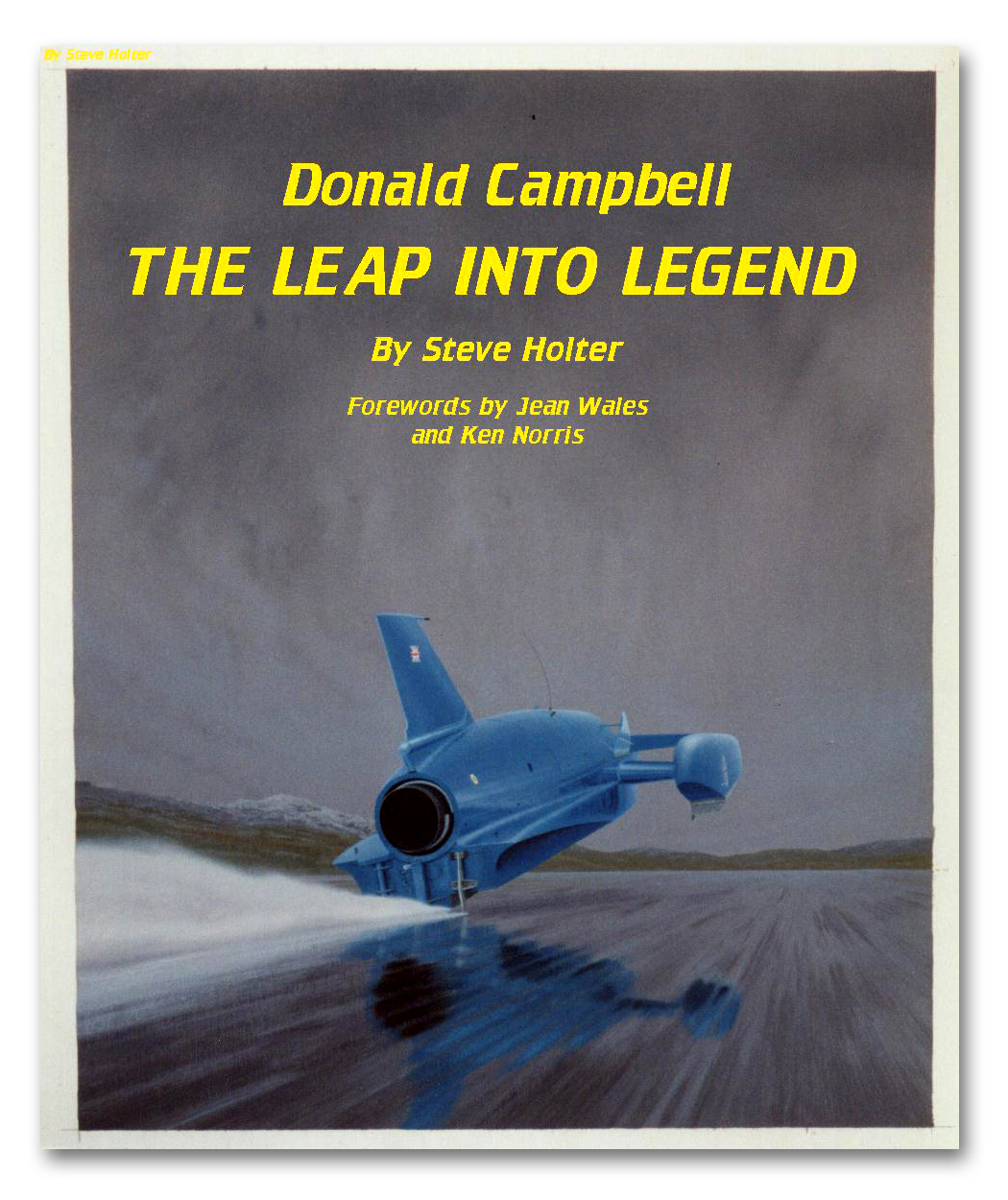
Leap into Legend, a book cover illustrated by Arthur Benjamins

From his first major exhibition at the rejuvenated 1983 Motor Sports Show at the Cunard Hotel in London, Benjamins' works were featured on 'News at Ten' on several occasions and in 1987 BBC motoring programme Top Gear featured him in a 6-minute slot.

About that time his interest in Land and Water Speed record breakers came to the fore. His first book jacket cover appeared on the cover of Power Boat Speed by Kevin Desmond which chronicled powerboating from 1896 onwards One of his paintings appeared in the Italian version of Pilote Che Gente by Enzo Ferrari and just before his death in 1988, Commendatore Ferrari presented Benjamins with a signed copy. In 1990, and with the full approval of Ken Norris, who designed the Bluebird car and boat in which Englishman, Donald Campbell broke many speed records, Benjamins set up Bluebird Publications to issue many of his record breaker prints. Other book jackets followed. Leap into Legend by Steve Holter, Race against the Odds again by Kevin Desmond. and "The British Are Coming, British Record Breaking and the people that made it Happen" by Mike Varndell (. Benjamins has also evoked historic aviation scenes.

In recognition of his service to powerboating via his Speed record breaker paintings, in 2007 he was awarded the Heritage Motorboat Trophy

In March 2018, Benjamins was awarded the honor of producing the artwork for the 30th Motorsports Hall of Fame of America inductee awards. They induct between 6 and 10 people annually who have played very significant roles in aviation, boating and motor racing. The Motorsports Hall of Fame of America used Benjamins' artwork for all publicity posters and yearbooks for this event. Previous inductees include, Mario Andretti, Arie Luyendyk, Richard Petty, Howard Hughes, Bobby Allison, Rusty Wallace, Emerson Fittipaldi and many more.

== Exhibitions ==
His first contact with the motor racing enthusiasts started in 1972 at a small Racing Car Show in the Netherlands, followed by shows in Zandvoort during their Grands Prix there. This is where he received encouragement from Formula One team bosses Ken Tyrrell, Teddy Mayer and driver Emerson Fittipaldi. A 1975 showing at the Whitechapel Art Gallery and a One-Man 1979 London exhibition allowed him to introduce both his motor racing and Science fantasy paintings and which culminated in exhibitions in Venice (Museum of Modern Art) and in Mdina, Malta. From 1983 he became a regular exhibitor at the British Racing Car Shows in London and Birmingham and at the Silverstone Coys festivals and Goodwood Festivals of Speed. In 1998 he had a one-man exhibition at the 'Napier Gallery' on Jersey. The show's patron was a Formula-1 sponsor and was officially opened by the Formula-1 team boss, Eddie Jordan. Since his US arrival, Arthur Benjamins has exhibited in Scottsdale, various Arizona Fine Art Expos. Barrett-Jackson car auctions and various shows in Palm Springs, California. He currently teaches Neoplasticism for the 'Children's Art Program' at the Peoria (AZ) library. He was invited to support the American Healing Arts Foundation for veterans by teaching Neoplasticism and with which he will continue.

== Change of style ==
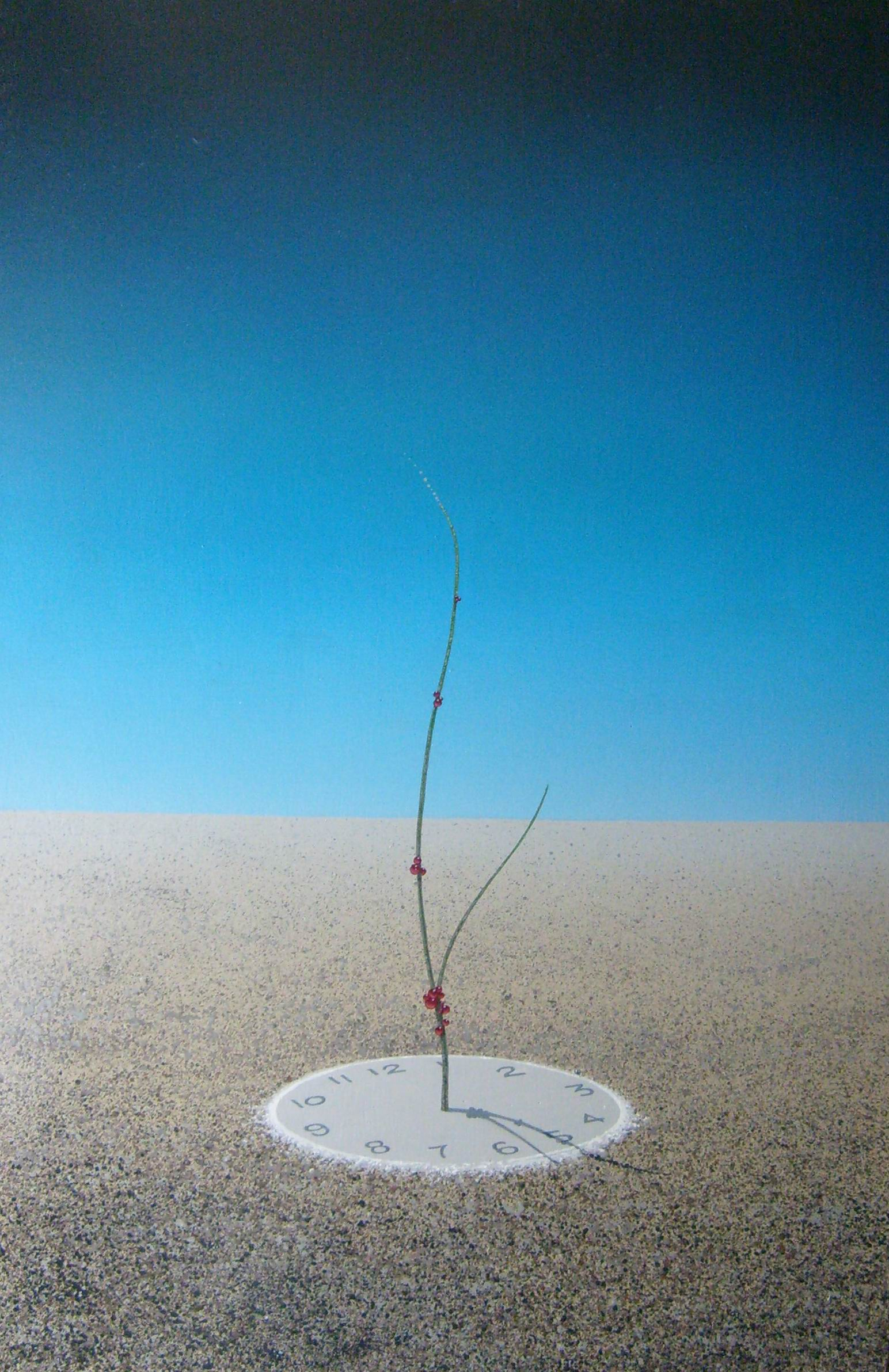
My Father. My King, by Arthur Benjamins

In 2000, he embarked on a period of transition, culminating in a change of painting style which leans towards abstract. Motoring magazine Classic & Sports Car featured a two-page article on his new style. Since his move to Phoenix, Arizona, United States, in 2014, Benjamins continues as a 'full-on' abstract art. He has hosted exhibitions in the UK, North America, in Venice, Malta, Jersey, Holland and, recently, also in Helsinki From "Abstract Iconography", he is now reviving the Neo-plasticist style pioneered by his fellow countryman Piet Mondrian (1872–1944).

== Design achievements ==
His designs in the security world of 'closures', that are produced in their many millions, has set his name to eight patents. He has also worked for Formula-1 Supremo Bernie Ecclestone's Formula One Management as a designer before branching out as a freelance designer of bespoke accessories for motor cycles. He has also designed several fonts and typefaces.

== Writing achievements ==
He has also written his father's 181.000-word biography, To Die Fighting, which takes the reader through his father's early life, through Westerbork, Terezin, Auschwitz and Buchenwald concentration camps and into his later years, covering life in Africa, enduring a sojourn through the war-torn Belgian Congo in search of millions of dollars' worth of hidden diamonds. He also writes short stories which are part fiction and non-fiction
