= Ombrone (department) =

Former French department in Italy (1808–1814)

Department of Ombrone Département de l'Ombrone (French)
- Department of the First French Empire
- 1808–1814
- Location of Ombrone in France (1812)
- Capital: Siena
- Area
  - Coordinates: 43°20′N 11°20′E
  - 1812: 7,748.97 km^{2} (2,991.89 sq mi)
- Population
  - 1812: 189,307
- History
  - Annexion from the Kingdom of Etruria: 25 May 1808
  - Treaty of Paris: 1814
- Political subdivisions: 3 arrondissements
Preceded by	Succeeded by
Kingdom of Etruria	Grand Duchy of Tuscany

Ombrone (French: [ɔ̃.bʁɔn]) was a department of the First French Empire in what is now Italy. It was named after the river Ombrone. It was formed in 1808, when the Kingdom of Etruria (formerly the Grand Duchy of Tuscany) was annexed directly to France. Its capital was Siena.

The department was disbanded after the defeat of Napoleon in 1814. At the Congress of Vienna, the Grand Duchy of Tuscany was restored to its previous Habsburg-Lorraine prince, Ferdinand III. Its territory is now divided between the Italian provinces of Siena, Arezzo and Grosseto.

== Subdivisions ==
The department was subdivided into the following arrondissements and cantons (situation in 1812):

- Siena, cantons: Bucine, Colle, Chiusdino, Poggibonsi, Radda, Radicondoli, Rapolano, Siena (2 cantons) and Sovicille.
- Grosseto, cantons: Arcidosso, Campagnatico, Santa Fiora, Isola del Giglio, Grosseto, Massa, Manciano, Orbetello, Pitigliano, Roccastrada and Scansano.
- Montepulciano, cantons: Abbadia San Salvatore, Asinalunga, Chiusi, Montalcino, Montepulciano, Pienza and Sarteano.

Its population in 1812 was 189,307, and its area was 774,897 hectares.

== See also ==
- Tuscany
- History of Tuscany
- Rulers of Tuscany
