= Méditerranée (department) =

Former French department in Italy (1808–1814)

Département de la Méditerranée
- department of the First French Empire
- 1808–1814
- Location of Méditerranée in France (1812)
- Capital: Livorno
- Area
  - Coordinates: 43°33′N 10°19′E
  - 1812: 4,910 km^{2} (1,900 sq mi)
- Population
  - 1812: 318,725
- History
  - Annexation from the Kingdom of Etruria: 25 May 1808
  - Treaty of Fontainebleau: 1814
- Political subdivisions: 4 arrondissements
Preceded by	Succeeded by
Kingdom of Etruria	Grand Duchy of Tuscany; Principality of Elba

Méditerranée (French pronunciation: [meditɛʁane]) was a department of the First French Empire in present-day Italy. It was named after the Mediterranean Sea. It was formed in 1808, when the Kingdom of Etruria (formerly the Grand Duchy of Tuscany) was annexed directly to France. Its capital was Livorno.

The department was disbanded after the defeat of Napoleon in 1814. At the Congress of Vienna, the Grand Duchy of Tuscany was restored to its previous Habsburg-Lorraine prince, Ferdinand III. Its territory is now divided between the Italian provinces of Livorno, Pisa, Florence and Siena.

== Subdivisions ==
Coat of arms of the commune of Livorno under the French Empire

The department was subdivided into the following arrondissements and cantons (situation in 1812):

- Livorno, cantons: Fauglia, Lari, Livorno (4 cantons), San Miniato, Peccioli, Pontedera and Rosignano.
- Elba island, cantons: Portoferraio (sous-préfecture) and Porto Longone.
- Pisa, cantons: Bagni di San Giuliano, Barga, Bientina, Borgo a Buggiano, Cascina, Castelfranco di Sotto, Cerreto, Fucecchio, Montecarlo, Montecatini, Pescia, Pietrasanta, Pisa (3 cantons), Seravezza and Vicopisano.
- Volterra, cantons: Campiglia, Castelfiorentino, San Gimignano, Guardistallo, Montaione, Palaia, Pomarance and Volterra.

Its population in 1812 was 318,725, and its area was 491,000 hectares.

Elba was, from 1808 to 1811 a separate entity, ruled by a Commissaire général.

== See also ==
- Tuscany
  - History of Tuscany
- Rulers of Tuscany
- First French Empire
- Grand Duchy of Tuscany
- House of Bourbon-Parma
- House of Habsburg-Lorraine
- Kingdom of Etruria
- Medici Family
