= Arno (department) =

Former French department in Italy (1808–1814)

Coordinates: 43.77°N 11.25°E

Department of Arno Département de l'Arno
- department of the First French Empire
- 1808–1814
- Location of Arno in France (1812)
- Capital: Florence
- Area
  - 1812: 8,074.75 km^{2} (3,117.68 sq mi)
- Population
  - 1812: 584,475
- History
  - Annexion from the Kingdom of Etruria: 25 May 1808
  - Treaty of Paris: 1814
- Political subdivisions: 4 arrondissements
Preceded by	Succeeded by
Kingdom of Etruria	Grand Duchy of Tuscany

Coat of arms of Florence under the French Empire

Arno (French: [aʁno]) was a department of the First French Empire in what is now Italy, named after the Arno river. It was formed in 1808, when the Kingdom of Etruria (formerly the Grand Duchy of Tuscany) was annexed directly to France. Its capital was Florence.

The department was disbanded after the defeat of Napoleon in 1814. At the 1814–1815 Congress of Vienna, the Grand Duchy of Tuscany was restored to its previous Habsburg-Lorraine prince, Ferdinand III. Its territory is now divided between the Italian provinces of Florence, Prato, Arezzo, Pistoia and Forlì-Cesena.

== Subdivisions ==
The department was subdivided into the following arrondissements and cantons (situation in 1812):

- Florence, cantons: Florence (6 cantons), Bagno a Ripoli, Barberino di Mugello, Borgo San Lorenzo, Campi, San Casciano, Dicomano, Empoli, Fiesole, Galluzzo, Greve, Lastra, Montelupo, Montespertoli, Pontassieve, Reggello, Scarperia, Sesto and Tavarnelle.
- Arezzo, cantons: Arezzo (2 cantons), Anghiari, Bibbiena, Borgo Santo Sepolcro, Castel Focognano, Castel San Niccolò, Castiglion Fiorentino, Civitella, Cortona, Figline, Foiano, Lucignano, Monte San Savino, Montevarchi, Pieve Santo Stefano, Poppi, Pratovecchio, San Giovanni and Terranuova.
- Modigliana (created from part of the arrondissement of Florence in 1811), cantons: Modigliana, Bagno, Firenzuola, Galeata, Marradi, Rocca San Casciano and Sestino.
- Pistoia, cantons: Pistoia, Montale, Porta al Borgo, Porta San Marco, Prato-ville, Prato-contado, San Marcello, Sambuca, Serravalle and Tizzana.

Its population in 1812 was 584,475, and its area was 807,475 hectares.

== See also ==
- History of Tuscany
- List of historic states of Italy
- Rulers of Tuscany
