= Grand Duchy of Tuscany =

Italian state (1569–1801; 1814–1860)

Coordinates: 43°N 11°E

Grand Duchy of Tuscany Magnus Ducatus Etruriae (Latin) Granducato di Toscana (Italian)
- 1569–1801; 1814–1860
- Top: Flag (1532–1737); Bottom: Flag (1765–1800, 1815–1848, 1849–1860) Coat of arms under the Medici period Coat of arms under the Habsburg-Lorraine period
- Motto: Sotto una Fede et Legge un Signor solo (Italian for 'Under one Faith and Law one Lord alone')
- Anthem: La Leopolda
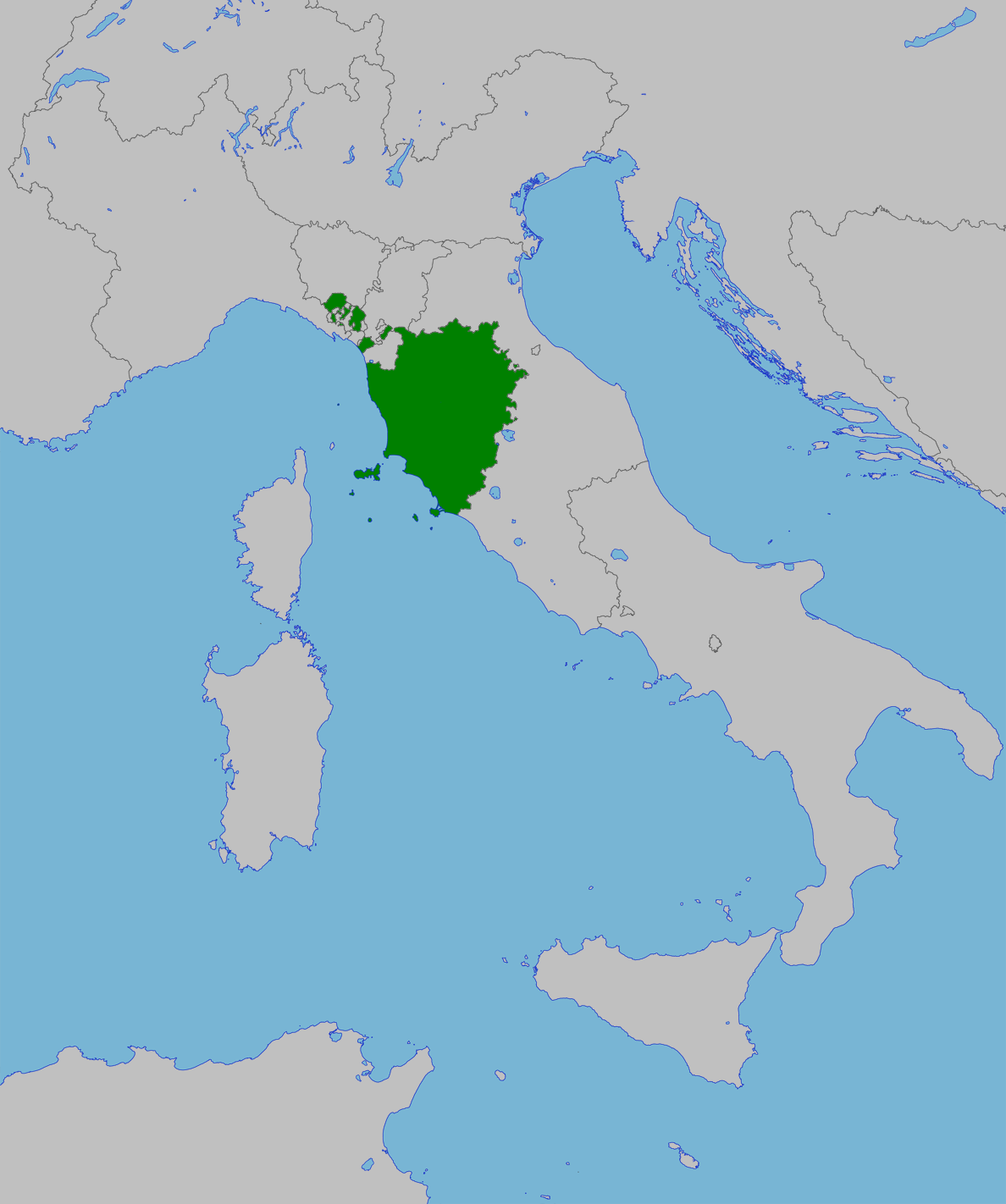
- Borders of the Grand Duchy of Tuscany (1815–1847)

- Administrative divisions of the Grand Duchy of Tuscany at the end of 1847
- Capital: Florence
- Official languages: Italian
- Religion: Roman Catholicism (official)
- Government: Feudal monarchy (1569–1801); Absolute monarchy (1814–1848, 1852–1860); Semi-constitutional monarchy (1848–1852)
- Grand Duke
  - 1569–1574 (first): Cosimo I
  - 1859–1860 (last): Ferdinand IV
- History
  - Cosimo I elevated to Grand Duke: 27 August 1569
  - End of Medici rule: 9 July 1737
  - Abolished during Napoleonic Wars: 21 March 1801
  - Re-establishment: 30 May 1814
  - Deposition of the Grand Duke: 16 August 1859
  - Merged to form the United Provinces of Central Italy: 8 December 1859
  - Annexed to Sardinia: 22 March 1860

Area
  - 1852: 8,381 sq mi (21,710 km^{2})

Population
  - 1801: 1,096,641
  - 1857: 1,783,279
- Currency: Tuscan lira (until 1826); Tuscan fiorino (1826–1859)
Preceded by
| 1569: Duchy of Florence |
| 1814: Arno |
| Méditerranée |
| Ombrone |
Succeeded by
| 1801: Kingdom of Etruria |
| 1860: United Provinces of Central Italy |
- Today part of: Italy

The Grand Duchy of Tuscany (Italian: Granducato di Toscana; Latin: Magnus Ducatus Etruriae, lit. 'Grand Duchy of Etruria') was an Italian monarchy located in Central Italy that existed, with interruptions, from 1569 to 1860, replacing the Republic of Florence. The grand duchy's capital was Florence. In the 19th century the population of the Grand Duchy was about 1,815,000 inhabitants.

Having brought nearly all Tuscany under his control after conquering the Republic of Siena, Cosimo I de' Medici, was elevated by a papal bull of Pope Pius V to Grand Duke of Tuscany on 27 August 1569. The Grand Duchy was ruled by the House of Medici until the extinction of its senior branch in 1737. While not as internationally renowned as the old republic, the grand duchy thrived under the Medici and it bore witness to unprecedented economic and military success under Cosimo I and his sons, until the reign of Ferdinando II, which saw the beginning of the state's long economic decline. That economic decline continued under Cosimo III.

Francis Stephen of Lorraine, a cognatic descendant of the Medici, succeeded the family and ascended the throne of his Medicean ancestors, which was bestowed upon him as compensation for the unwelcome loss of his ancestral Duchy of Lorraine. Francis was also a future Holy Roman Emperor with lands throughout Europe, so Tuscany was governed by his viceroy, Marc de Beauvau, Prince of Craon. His descendants ruled, and resided in, the grand duchy until its end in 1859, barring one interruption, when Napoleon Bonaparte gave Tuscany to the House of Bourbon-Parma (Kingdom of Etruria, 1801–1807), then annexed it directly to the First French Empire. Following the collapse of the Napoleonic system in 1814, the grand duchy was restored. In the lead up to the Italian unification Tuscany merged in 1859 with other former neighboring states and territories into the United Provinces of Central Italy, a client state of the Kingdom of Sardinia. It was within the United Provinces that Tuscany was formally annexed to the Kingdom of Italy the following year after a landslide plebiscite, in which 95% of voters approved.

== Medici period ==
=== Foundation ===
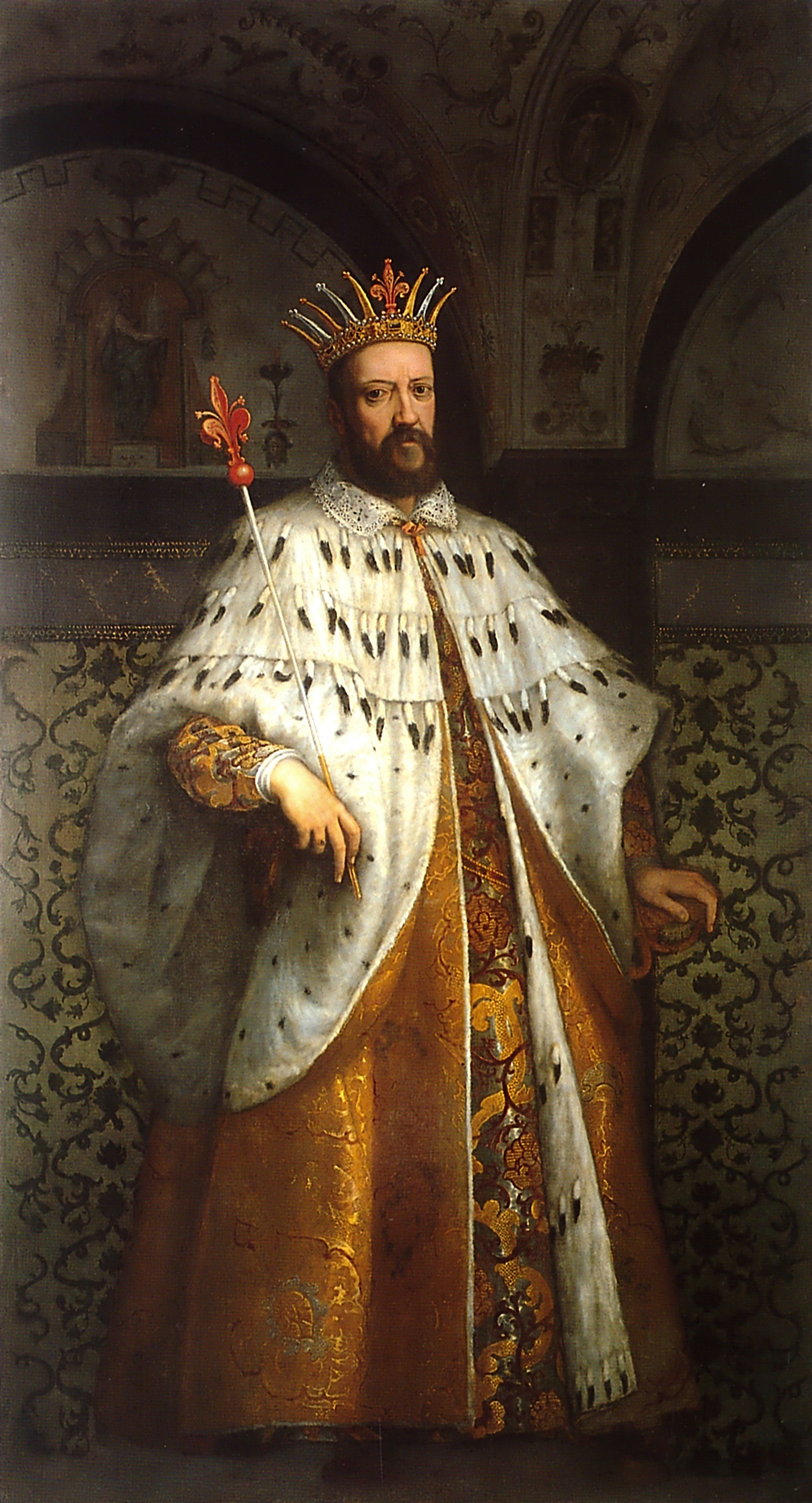
Cosimo I de' Medici

Coat of arms of House of Medici (Baroque era "3D" style)

In 1569, Cosimo de' Medici had ruled the Duchy of Florence for 32 years. During his reign, Florence purchased the island of Elba from the Republic of Genoa (in 1548), conquered Siena (in 1555) and developed a well-equipped and powerful naval base on Elba. Cosimo also banned the clergy from holding administrative positions and promulgated laws of freedom of religion, which were unknown during his time. Cosimo also was a long-term supporter of Pope Pius V, who in the light of Florence's expansion in August 1569, declared Cosimo Grand Duke of Tuscany, a title unprecedented in Italy.

The international reaction to Cosimo's elevation was bleak. Queen Catherine of France, though herself a Medici, viewed Cosimo with the utmost disdain. Rumours circulated at the Viennese court that had Cosimo as a candidate for King of England. Maximilian II, Holy Roman Emperor and his cousin King Philip II of Spain reacted quite angrily, as they claimed Florence was an Imperial fief and held Pius V's actions were invalid. However, Maximilian eventually confirmed the elevation with an Imperial diploma issued on 2 November 1575 in favour of Cosimo's successor, Francesco I, who had subsequently to pay the imperial Hofkammer a compensation of 100,000 ducats. In 1576, Philip II too recognized the Medici's new grand ducal title.

During the Holy League of 1571, Cosimo fought against the Ottoman Empire, siding with the other Catholic powers, such as Venice and the Spanish Empire. The Holy League inflicted a crushing defeat against the Ottomans at the Battle of Lepanto. Cosimo's reign was one of the most militaristic Tuscany had ever seen.

Cosimo experienced several personal tragedies during the later years of his reign. His wife, Eleanor of Toledo, died in 1562, along with four of his children due to a plague epidemic in Florence. These deaths were to affect him greatly, which, along with illness, forced Cosimo to unofficially abdicate in 1564. This left his eldest son, Francesco, to rule the duchy. Cosimo I died in 1574 of apoplexy, leaving a stable and extremely prosperous Tuscany behind him, having been the longest ruling Medici yet.

=== Francesco and Ferdinando I ===
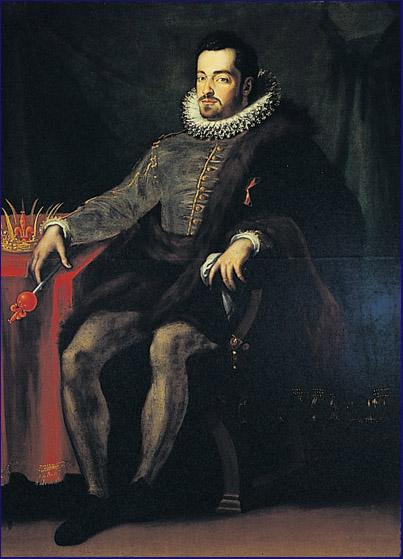
The Grand Duke Ferdinando I.

Francesco had little interest in governing his realm, instead participating in scientific experiments. The administration of the state was delegated to bureaucrats. He continued his father's Austrian/Imperial alliance, cementing it by marrying Johanna of Austria. Francesco is best remembered for dying on the same day as his second wife, Bianca Cappello, spurring rumours of poisoning. He was succeeded by Ferdinando de' Medici, his younger brother, whom he loathed.

Ferdinando eagerly assumed the government of Tuscany. He commanded the draining of the Tuscan marshlands, built a road network in Southern Tuscany, and cultivated trade in Livorno. To augment the Tuscan silk industry, he oversaw the planting of mulberry trees along the major roads (silk worms feed on mulberry leaves). He shifted Tuscany away from Habsburg (Note: Austria and Spain were ruled by the House of Habsburg; the two are interchangeable terms for the time period in question.) hegemony by marrying the first non-Habsburg candidate since Alessandro de' Medici, Duke of Florence, Christina of Lorraine, a granddaughter of Catherine de' Medici. The Spanish reaction was to construct a citadel on their portion of the island of Elba. To strengthen the new Tuscan alliance, he married the deceased Francesco's younger daughter, Marie, to Henry IV of France. Henry explicitly stated that he would defend Tuscany from Spanish aggression, but later reneged. Ferdinando was forced to marry his heir, Cosimo II, to Archduchess Maria Maddalena of Austria to assuage Spain (where Maria Maddalena's sister was the incumbent Queen consort). Ferdinando sponsored a Tuscan colony in America, with the intention of establishing a Tuscan settlement in the area of what is now French Guiana. Despite all of these incentives to economic growth and prosperity, the population of Florence, at dawn of the 17th century, was a mere 75,000 souls, far smaller than the other capitals of Italy: Rome, Milan, Venice, Palermo and Naples. Francesco and Ferdinando, due to lax distinction between Medici and Tuscan state property, are thought to have been wealthier than their ancestor, Cosimo de' Medici, the founder of the dynasty. The Grand Duke alone had the prerogative to exploit the state's mineral and salt resources. The fortunes of the Medici were directly tied to the Tuscan economy.

Ferdinando, despite no longer being a cardinal, exercised much influence at successive Papal conclaves; elections which chose the Pope, the head of the Catholic Church. In 1605, Ferdinando succeeded in getting his candidate, Alessandro de' Medici, elected as Pope Leo XI. Leo XI died less than a month later, but fortunately for the Medici his successor Pope Paul V was also pro-Medici. Ferdinando's pro-Papal foreign policy, however, had drawbacks. Tuscany was overcome with religious orders, all of whom were not obliged to pay taxes. Ferdinando died in 1609, leaving an affluent realm; however, his inaction in international affairs drew Tuscany into the provincial yolk of politics.

=== Cosimo II and Ferdinando II ===
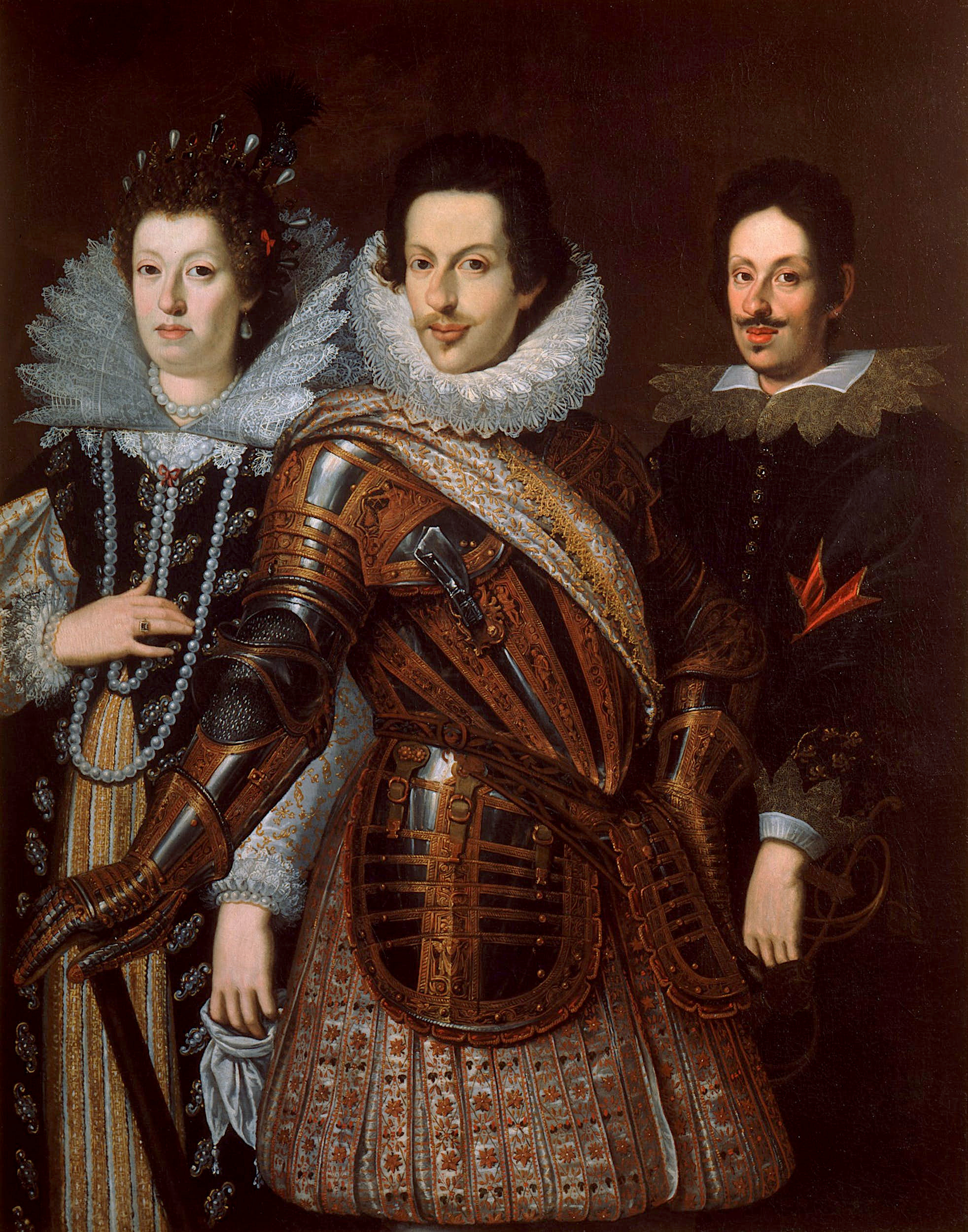
Maria Maddalena, Cosimo II and Ferdinando II, painting after Justus Sustermans

Ferdinando's elder son, Cosimo, mounted the throne following his death. Like his uncle, Francesco I, government held no appeal for him, and Tuscany was ruled by his ministers. Cosimo II's twelve-year reign was punctuated by his contented marriage with Maria Maddalena and his patronage of astronomer Galileo Galilei.

When Cosimo died, his oldest son, Ferdinando, was still a minor. This led to a regency of Ferdinand's grandmother, Dowager Grand Duchess Christina, and his mother, Maria Maddalena of Austria. Christina heavily relied on priests as advisors, lifting Cosimo I's ban on clergy holding administrative roles in government, and promoted monasticism. Christina dominated her grandson long after he came of age until her death in 1636. His mother and grandmother arranged a marriage with Vittoria della Rovere, the granddaughter of Francesco Maria II della Rovere, Duke of Urbino, in 1634. Together they had two children: Cosimo (III), in 1642, and Francesco, in 1660.

Ferdinando was obsessed with new technology, and had several hygrometers, barometers, thermometers, and telescopes installed in the Pitti. In 1657, Leopoldo de' Medici, the Grand Duke's youngest brother, established the Accademia del Cimento, which set up to attract scientists from all over Tuscany to Florence for mutual study.

Tuscany was one of the states of the Holy Roman Empire that sided with the Emperor in the Thirty Years War, sending thousands of troops to support the pro-Imperial side from 1631. Among the commanders of the detachment were three of the grand duke's brothers; two died and one, Mattias de' Medici, became general of artillery and served for a decade. Like the Empire's other loyal Italian subjects, the Tuscans were "hawks" who supported prosecuting the war to its conclusion. Francesco de' Medici, Mattias de' Medici, and Ottavio Piccolomini (an Imperial general of Sienese origin) were among the ringleaders in the plot to assassinate field marshal Albrecht von Wallenstein, for which they were rewarded with spoils by Emperor Ferdinand II.

Tuscany participated in the Wars of Castro (the last time Medicean Tuscany proper was involved in a conflict) and inflicted a defeat on the forces of Pope Urban VIII in 1643. The treasury was so empty that when the Castro mercenaries were paid for, the state could no longer afford to pay interest on government bonds. The interest rate was lowered by 0.75%. The economy was so decrepit that barter trade became prevalent in rural market places. The exchequer was barely adequate to cover the state's current expenditure, resulting in a complete termination of banking operations for the Medici. Ferdinando II died in 1670, succeeded by his oldest surviving son Cosimo.

=== Cosimo III ===
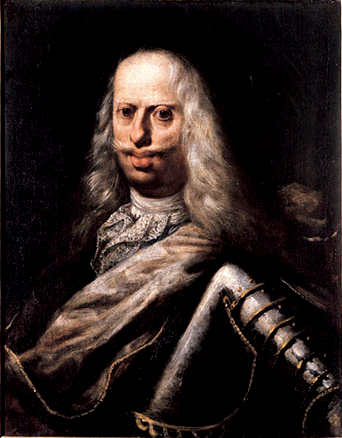
The Grand Duke Cosimo III in old age

Cosimo III's reign was characterised by drastic changes and a sharp decline of the Grand Duchy. Cosimo III was of a puritan character, banning May celebrations, forcing prostitutes to pay for licenses, and beheading sodomites. He also instituted several laws censoring education and introduced anti-Jewish legislation. He imposed crippling taxes while the country's population continued to decline. By 1705, the grand ducal treasury was virtually bankrupt, and the population of Florence had declined by approximately 50%, while the population of the entire grand duchy had decreased by an estimated 40%. The once powerful navy was reduced to a pitiful state.

Cosimo frequently paid the Holy Roman Emperor, his feudal overlord, high dues. He sent munitions to the Emperor during the Battle of Vienna. Tuscany was neutral during the War of the Spanish Succession, partly due to Tuscany's ramshackle military; a 1718 military review revealed that the army numbered less than 3,000 men, many of whom were infirm and elderly. Meanwhile, the state's capital, Florence, had become full of beggars. Europe heard of the perils of Tuscany, and Joseph I, Holy Roman Emperor asserted a remote claim to the grand duchy (through some Medici descent), but died before he could press the matter. The Treaty of the Hague reconfirmed the statuses of Tuscany and Parma-Piacenza as imperial fiefs.

Cosimo married Marguerite Louise d'Orléans, a granddaughter of Henry IV of France and Marie de' Medici. Their union wrought a high level of discontentment, but despite the tension they had three children, Ferdinando, Anna Maria Luisa de' Medici, Electress Palatine and the last Medicean grand duke of Tuscany, Gian Gastone de' Medici.

Cosimo contemplated restoring the Republic of Florence, a decision that was complicated by the Grand Duchy's feudal status: Florence was an Imperial fief, Siena a Spanish one. The plan was about to be approved by the powers convened at Geertruidenberg when Cosimo abruptly added that if himself and his two sons predeceased his daughter, the Electress Palatine, she should succeed and the republic be re-instituted following her death. The proposal sank, and ultimately died with Cosimo in 1723.

=== The last years of the Medicis ===
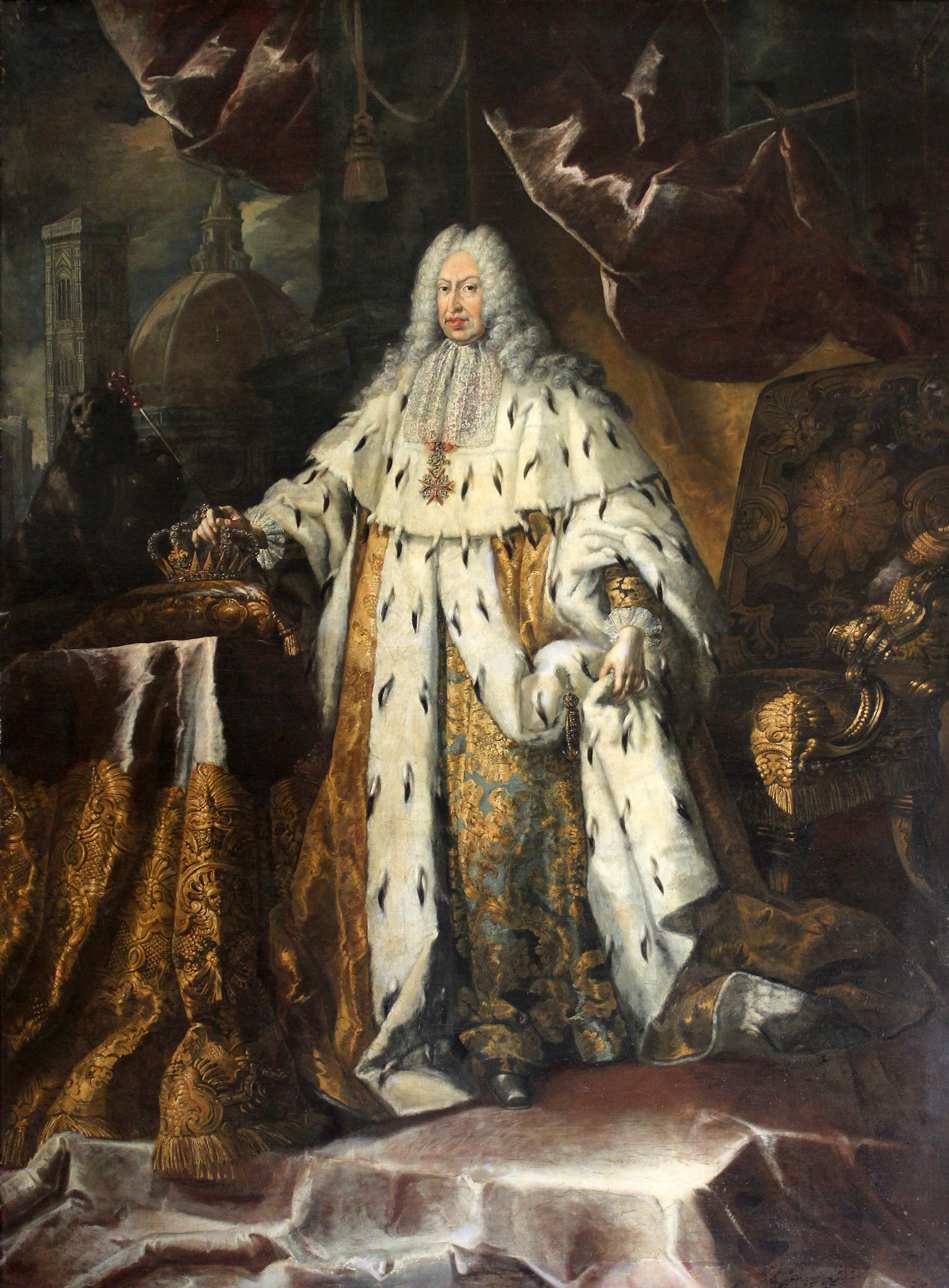
The Grand Duke Gian Gastone's coronation portrait; he was the last Medicean monarch of Tuscany

As Grand Prince Ferdinando, Gian Gastone's elder brother, predeceased Cosimo III, Gian Gastone succeeded his father in 1723. Gian Gastone for most of his life, kept to his bed and acted in an unregal manner, rarely appearing to his subjects, to the extent that, at times, he had been thought dead. Gian Gastone would repeal his father's puritan laws. In 1731, the Powers gathered at Vienna to decide who would succeed Gian Gastone. They drew up the Treaty of Vienna, which gave the grand ducal throne to Don Carlos, Duke of Parma. Gian Gastone was not as steadfast in negotiating Tuscany's future as his father was. He capitulated to foreign demands, and instead of endorsing the claim to the throne of his closest agnatic relative, the Prince of Ottajano, he allowed Tuscany to be bestowed upon Don Carlos. During the War of the Polish Succession, Don Carlos conquered the Kingdom of Naples and was forced to give up the Tuscan succession by the Treaty of Vienna (1738). Soon after, Francis Stephen of Lorraine became heir to the Tuscan throne. Gian Gastone had no say in events and had become quite attached to the Spanish Infante. The Tuscans despised the new occupying "Lorrainers", as they interfered with the Tuscan government, while the occupying Spaniards had not done so. On 9 July 1737, Gian Gastone died; the last male Medici of the grand ducal line.

== House of Habsburg-Lorraine ==
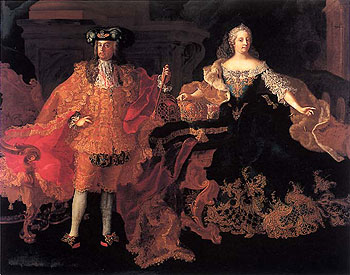
A doppelporträt of Francis Stephen and his wife Maria Theresa, by Peter Kobler von Ehrensorg

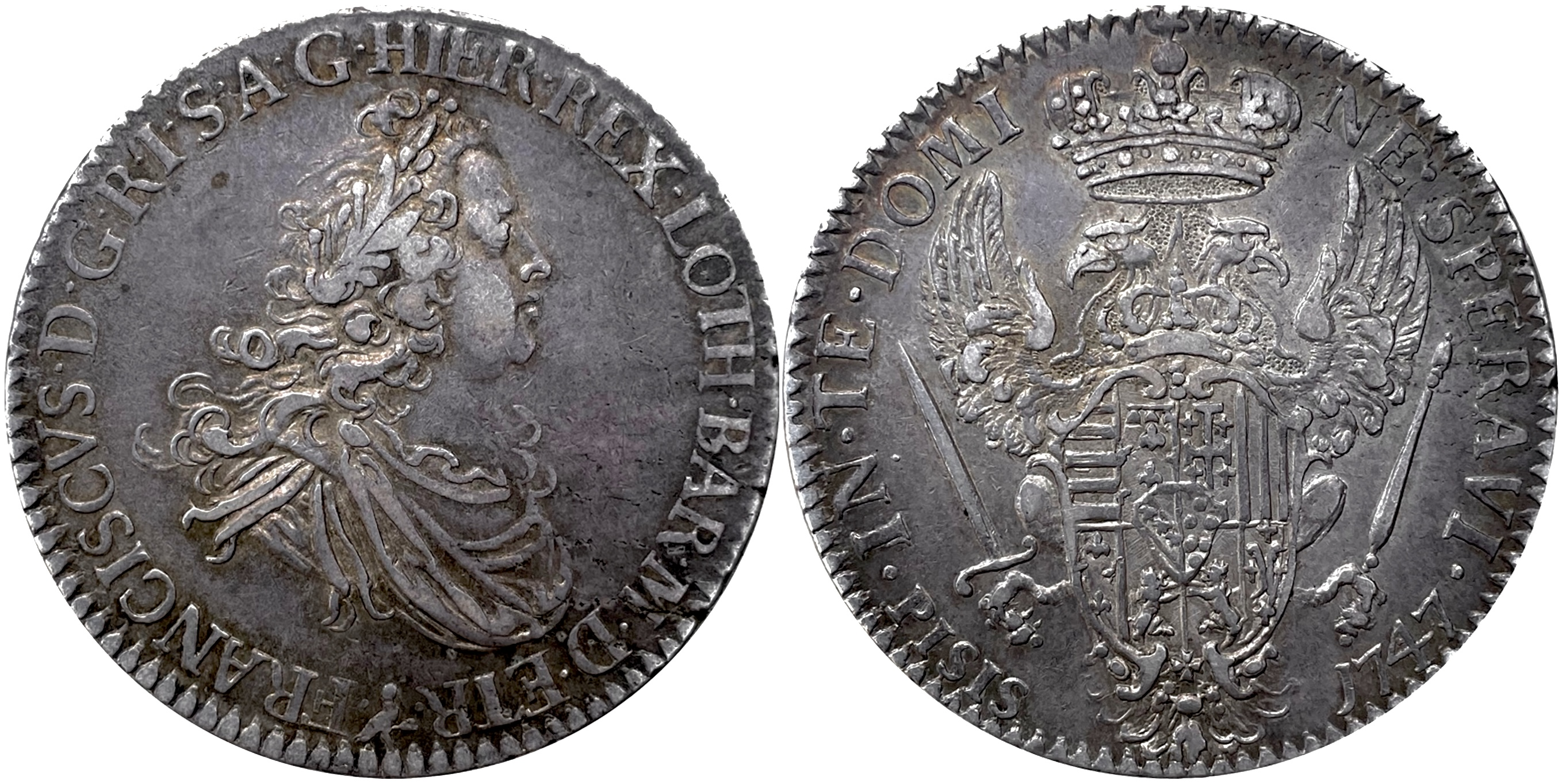
Silver coin: 10 paoli of Grand Duchy of Tuscana 1747, under Francis of House Lorraine

=== Francis Stephen ===
Coat of arms of the House of Habsburg-Lorraine, Tuscan branch.

Francis I (as Francis Stephen became known) lived in Florence briefly with his wife, the Habsburg heiress Maria Theresa, who became Tuscany's grand duchess. Francis had to cede his ancestral Duchy of Lorraine in order to accommodate the deposed ruler of Poland, whose daughter Marie Leszczyńska was Queen of France. Marie's father Stanisław Leszczyński ruled Lorraine as compensation for his loss of the Kingdom of Poland. Francis was reluctant to resign the duchy, but Charles VI, Holy Roman Emperor (Maria Theresa's father) stated that if he did not relinquish his rights to Lorraine, he could not marry Maria Theresa. Francis did not live in his Tuscan realm, and lived in the capital of his wife's realm, Vienna. He was elected Holy Roman Emperor in 1745. He died at Innsbruck from a stroke in 1765; his wife pledged the rest of her life to mourning him, while co-ruling with her first son, her own heir apparent, and Francis' imperial successor Joseph II.

The administrative structure of the grand duchy itself would see little change under Francis I. Since their accession to the throne of Grand Dukes, however, the Habsburgs continually tried to make Tuscany a source of military power, to little success, as Tuscany had declined and demilitarized in the 18th century. Such was the failure of their initial effort that Vienna declared Tuscany to be neutral during the War of the Austrian Succession, and enemy troops crossed it unopposed. At that time the Habsburgs' efforts had only managed to muster a standing army of 3,000 poorly trained troops. A modest plan to create a 5,000-strong Tuscan army under German officers was only semi-successful. Tuscan troops served the Emperor in Silesia during the Seven Years' War. The first contingent of 3,000 troops arrived in 1758, followed by a second contingent of 1,500, and subsequent smaller ones to replace losses from battle and disease. The fear that the Emperor would impose conscription on the duchy caused 2% of the population (of 800,000) to flee to the Papal States.

In 1763, when nuptial agreements for the marriage of the imperial couple's second surviving son, Leopold, and the Infanta of Spain, Maria Luisa of Bourbon, were stipulated, Tuscany was erected into a secundogeniture. Thus, upon the death of Francis I, it was Leopold who directly succeeded him on the throne of the Grand Duchy.

=== Reform ===
Grand Duke Leopold I with his children and wife, 1776

Leopold, usually referred to in Italy as "Pietro Leopoldo", ruled the country until his brother Joseph's death and his own election as Holy Roman Emperor in 1790. He was unpopular among his subjects, though his many reforms brought the Grand Duchy to a level of stability that had not been seen in quite a while.

Leopold developed and supported many social and economic reforms. He revamped the taxation and tariff system. Smallpox vaccination was made systematically available (Leopold's mother Maria Theresa had been a huge supporter of inoculation against smallpox), and an early institution for the rehabilitation of juvenile delinquents was founded. Leopold also abolished capital punishment. On 30 November 1786, after having de facto blocked capital executions (the last dated back to 1769), Leopold promulgated the reform of the penal code that abolished the death penalty and ordered the destruction of all the instruments for capital execution in his land. Torture was also banned.

Leopold also introduced radical reforms to the system of neglect and inhumane treatment of the mentally ill. On 23 January 1774, the legge sui pazzi (law regarding the insane) was established, the first of its kind to be introduced in Europe, allowing steps to be taken to hospitalize individuals deemed insane. A few years later Leopold undertook the project of building a new hospital, the Bonifacio. He used his skill at choosing collaborators to put a young physician, Vincenzo Chiarugi, at its head. Chiarugi and his collaborators introduced new humanitarian regulations in the running of the hospital and caring for the mentally ill patients, including banning the use of chains and physical punishment, and in so doing have been recognized as early pioneers of what later came to be known as the moral treatment movement.

Leopold attempted to secularize the property of the religious houses or to put the clergy entirely under the control of the government. These measures, which disturbed the convictions of his people and brought him into collision with the pope, were not successful.

Leopold also approved and collaborated on the development of a political constitution, said to have anticipated by many years the promulgation of the French constitution and which presented some similarities with the Virginia Bill of Rights of 1778. Leopold's concept of this was based on respect for the political rights of citizens and on a harmony of power between the executive and the legislative. However, the constitution was so radically new that it garnered opposition even from those who might have benefited from it. In 1790, Emperor Joseph II died without issue before carrying out his project for the abolition of secundogeniture in Tuscany, partly due to Leopold's latent resistance. Thus, when the latter was called to Vienna, to assume the rule of his family's Austrian dominions and become Emperor, his second-born son Ferdinand immediately succeeded him as head of the Grand Duchy. Leopold himself died in 1792.

Following the serious Sanfedist disorders that occurred in Tuscany upon Leopold's departure for Austria, the new emperor partially revoked the abolition of the death penalty ordered 4 years earlier, and in 1795 Ferdinand further expanded the scope of its application.

=== Tuscany during the French Revolutionary and Napoleonic Wars ===
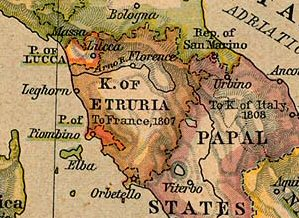
The Kingdom of Etruria, Tuscany's successor state during the Napoleonic Wars

Leopold was succeeded by Ferdinand III. Ferdinand was the son of Leopold I, and Grand Duchess Maria Louisa. He was forced out by the French during the French Revolutionary Wars, first in spring 1799 when a Provisional Government of Tuscany was created by the French army, and then after the Treaty of Aranjuez (1801), becoming instead Elector of Salzburg, ruling the territory of the former archbishopric. The Grand Duchy was then dissolved, and replaced by the Kingdom of Etruria under the House of Bourbon-Parma, in compensation for their loss of Duchy of Parma. In 1803, the first King of Etruria, Louis I, died and was succeeded by his infant son, Charles Louis, under the regency of his mother, Queen María Luisa.

Etruria lasted less than a decade. By the Treaty of Fontainebleau (27 October 1807), Etruria was to be annexed by France. The negotiations had been between Spain and France, and the Etrurian regent was kept entirely in the dark, only being informed that she would have to leave her young son's kingdom on 23 November 1807. She and her court left on 10 December. On 30 May 1808, Etruria was formally annexed to France. An "Extraordinary Giunta" was placed in charge under General Jacques François Menou. Tuscany was divided into the départements of Arno, Méditerranée and Ombrone. In March 1809 a "General Government of the Departments of Tuscany" was set up, and Napoleon put his sister Elisa Bonaparte at its head, with the title of Grand Duchess of Tuscany.

=== Tuscany restored and its absorption into unified Italy ===
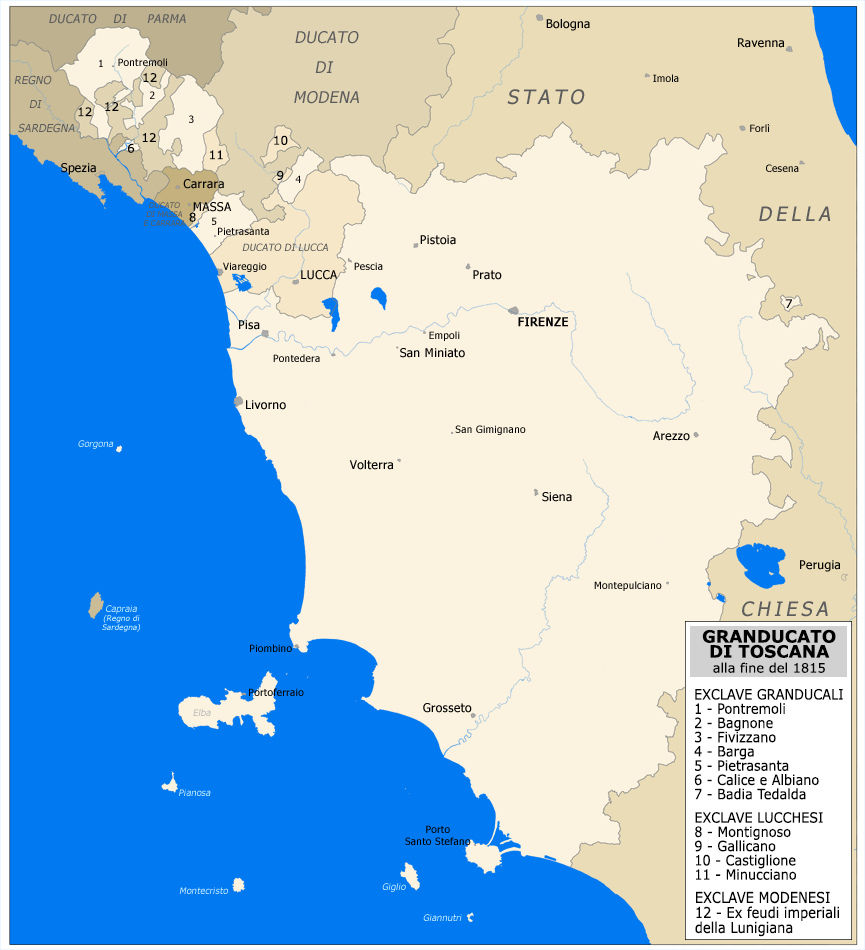
Map of Grand Duchy of Tuscany in 1815

The Napoleonic system collapsed in 1814, and the following territorial settlement agreed to at the Congress of Vienna, ceded the State of Presidi and the Principality of Piombino to a restored Tuscany. Ferdinand III resumed his rule, and died in 1824. Italian nationalism exploded in the post-Napoleonic years, leading to the establishment of secret societies bent on a unified Italy. When these leagues arrived in Tuscany, a concerned Ferdinand requisitioned an Austrian garrison, from his brother Emperor Francis of Austria, for the defence of the state. Ferdinand aligned Tuscany with Austria.

Following Ferdinand's death, his elder son, Leopold II, succeeded him. Leopold was contemporarily acknowledged as a liberal monarch. Despite his merits, most his subjects still dismissed him as a foreigner. His affinity for Austria was equally unpalatable.

In 1847, in application of the 1844 secret Treaty of Florence, Leopold II annexed the Duchy of Lucca, a state created by the Congress of Vienna solely to accommodate pro tem the House of Bourbon-Parma. Despite the bitter opposition of their matriarch, they had not been restored to their eponymous Duchy of Parma which had instead been bestowed for life upon the erstwhile Empress of the French, Marie Louise of Austria. In exchange, in addition to a suitable financial compensation, they were granted the right of reversion to the duchy itself upon the death of the former Empress. Meanwhile, they would rule the new Duchy of Lucca, to which the Grand Duke of Tuscany in turn enjoyed the right of reversion upon their future transfer to Parma or another suitable sovereign settlement. In October 1847, as she was still alive and reigning, (Note: She was to die suddenly by the end of the year.) the Duke of Lucca decided to prematurely abdicate his throne in favour of the Grand Duke of Tuscany, while the Lucca exclaves of Montignoso, Gallicano, Minucciano and Castiglione were given to the Duchy of Modena in accordance with the resolutions of the Congress of Vienna. Tuscany in turn ceded its Lunigiana domains either to Modena (Vicariate of Fivizzano), or to Parma (Vicariate of Pontremoli and other minor territories), retaining instead its ancient exclaves of Pietrasanta and Barga: the Congress had originally stipulated that they should be assigned to Modena, but, with the annexation of Lucca, they were no longer territorially separated from the rest of the Grand Duchy and loudly refused to be handed over to the unbeloved Modena House of Austria-Este. On taking possession of his new state, Leopold unexpectedly granted it the abolition of the death penalty, a measure whose effectiveness the supreme court of Florence hastened to extend to the entire territory of the Grand Duchy, at the beginning of 1848.

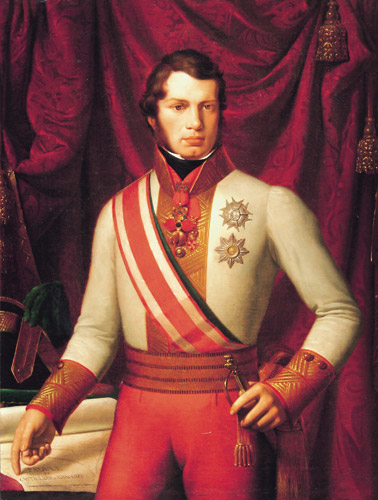
Leopold II, Grand Duke of Tuscany

In Leopold's years Italy was engulfed in popular rebellion, culminating in the Revolutions of 1848. The revolution toppled the throne of France, and caused disarray across Europe. In Tuscany, Leopold II sanctioned a liberal constitution; and instituted a liberal ministry. Despite his attempts at acquiescence, street fighting in opposition to the regime sprang up in August, in Livorno. Leopold II lent his support to the Kingdom of Sardinia in the First Italian War of Independence. In February 1849, Leopold II had to abandon Tuscany to republicans and sought refuge in the Neapolitan city of Gaeta. A provisional republic was established in his stead. It was only with Austrian assistance that Leopold could return to Florence. The constitution was revoked in 1852, as was the abolition of capital punishment. The Austrian garrison was withdrawn in 1855.

In March-April 1859, when the outbreak of the Second Italian War of Independence appeared imminent, Leopold rejected both the appeals to take the field alongside the King of Sardinia, and the advice to form a new government and abdicate in favour of his son Ferdinand. However, he also refused to consider any serious possibility of using force against the Italian patriots, and on the evening of 27 April 1859, he and his family abandoned Florence for Bologna in a convoy of four carriages, to the indifference and silence of his now erstwhile subjects.

Upon the departure of the sovereign, the revolutionary forces established a Provisional Government of Tuscany, presided over by Ubaldino Peruzzi, which offered dictatorship to Victor Emmanuel II, but the King of Sardinia chose to refuse it at the time given the uncertain international situation. In fact, in June, the Armistice of Villafranca stipulated that Leopold be allowed to return, although in practise this never happened. On 21 July he abdicated in favour of his elder son, Ferdinand IV, whose hypothetical reign, however, did not last long: the House of Habsburg-Lorraine was formally deposed by the Tuscan National Assembly on 16 August 1859.

In December 1859, not before the provisional government had abolished the abhorred death penalty for the third time, the Grand Duchy was joined to the Duchies of Modena and Parma to form the United Provinces of Central Italy, which were annexed by the Kingdom of Sardinia a few months later. On 22 March 1860, after a referendum that voted overwhelmingly (95%) in favour of a union with Sardinia, Tuscany was formally annexed to Sardinia as part of the new Kingdom of Italy. Strongly attached to its ideal traditions, it remained the only region in Italy to maintain the abolition of capital punishment in force until 1889, when it was eventually extended to the whole Kingdom with the promulgation of the new Zanardelli penal code.

== Government ==
Tuscany was divided into two main administrative districts: the stato nuovo (the new state) consisting of the former Republic of Siena, and the stato vecchio (the old state), the old Republic of Florence and her dependencies. The two areas were governed by separate laws. They were divided because the stato nuovo was a Spanish fief and the stato vecchio an Imperial one. Siena was ruled by a governor appointed by the grand duke. Charles V, Holy Roman Emperor proclaimed Alessandro de' Medici, Duke of Florence "for his lifetime, and after his death to be succeeded by his sons, male heirs and successors, of his body, by order of primogeniture, and failing them by the closest male of the Medici family, and likewise in succession forever, by order of primogeniture."

Following the Republic's surrender in the Siege of Florence, Charles V, Holy Roman Emperor issued a proclamation explicitly stating that he and he alone could determine the government of Florence. On 12 August 1530, the Emperor created the Medici hereditary rulers (capo) of the Republic of Florence. Pope Clement VII willed his relative Alessandro de' Medici to be the monarchical ruler of Florence, and went about requisitioning that dignity carefully; he wanted to give the impression that the Florentines democratically chose Alessandro to be their monarch. In April 1532, the Pope convinced the Balía, Florence's ruling commission, to draw up a new constitution. The document in question was officiated on the 27th of that month. It formally created a hereditary monarchy, abolished the age-old signoria (elective government) and the office of gonfaloniere (titular ruler of Florence elected for a two-month term); in their place was the consigliere, a four-man council elected for a three-month term, headed by the "Duke of the Florentine Republic" (and later the Grand Duke of Tuscany). The Senate, composed of forty-eight men, chosen by the constitutional reform commission, was vested with the prerogative of determining Florence's financial, security, and foreign policies. Additionally, the senate appointed the commissions of war and public security, and the governors of Pisa, Arezzo, Prato, Voltera and Cortona and ambassadors. To be eligible, one had to be male and a noble. The Council of Two Hundred was a petitions court; membership was for life. This constitution was still in effect through the Medicean grand duchy, albeit the institutions were decayed and powerless by the rule of Ferdinando II.

Over time, the Medici acquired several territories, which included: the County of Pitigliano, purchased from the Orsini family in 1604; the County of Santa Fiora, acquired from the House of Sforza in 1633; Spain ceded Pontremoli in 1650, Silvia Piccolomini sold her estates, the Marquisate of Castiglione at the time of Cosimo I, Lordship of Pietra Santa, and the Duchy of Capistrano and the city of Penna in the Kingdom of Naples. Vittoria della Rovere brought the Duchies of Montefeltro and Rovere into the family in 1631, upon her death in 1694, they passed to her younger son, Francesco Maria de' Medici. They reverted to the crown with the ascension of Gian Gastone.

Gian Gastone, the last Medici, resigned the grand duchy to Francis Stephen of Lorraine. Under him, Tuscany was ruled by a viceroy, Marc de Beauvau-Craon, Prince de Craon. Francis Stephen altered the laws of succession in 1763, when he declared his second son, Leopold, heir to the grand duchy. If Leopold's line were to become extinct, it would revert to the main line. Should Leopold or any of his direct successors somehow come into possession of the main domains of the Habsburg monarchy, the grand duchy would then pass on to their second son and the latter's successors. Every grand duke after Leopold resided in Florence. Grand Duke Leopold II agreed to ratify a liberal constitution in 1848. He was briefly deposed by a provisional government in 1849, but restored to power the same year by Austrian troops. The government was finally dissolved upon its annexation to the United Provinces of Central Italy in 1859. The court moved to Salzburg and lived there in exile until 1918.

== Military ==
=== Army ===
In addition to its regular army, the duchy maintained a citizen-militia. This was used both for the protection of towns and fortresses that the army was not able to garrison, and as a reserve from which semi-trained men would be drawn into the army. The militia had its origins in 1498, in the predecessor state of the Florentine Republic. By 1506, it numbered 20,000 men, of whom 70% carried pikes, 20% halberds/bills and hog-spears, and 10% either arquebuses or crossbows. However, the size and quality of the duchy's militia varied throughout its existence, as did its army.

From 1553 to 1559, Tuscany raised 30,000 troops for their participation in the Last Italian War, which saw the Republic of Siena being added to the duchy. For the decades thereafter, the grand dukes only maintained a peacetime force of 2,500 soldiers, 500 cavalry to patrol the coasts and 2,000 infantry to man castles (Cosimo I having significantly expanded Tuscany's fortification network in an effort to defend the country). An anonymous Venetian intelligence report from the late 16th century stated that Tuscany could spend 800,000 ducats annually on war (half as much as the Spanish-held Kingdom of Naples despite having a quarter of its population), and could raise 40,000 infantry and 2,000 cavalry, counting soldiers, militia, and mercenaries from nearby Corsica and Romagna, a force massively out of proportion to its population. Hanlon considers the report overly optimistic, but with some basis in fact.

In response to the Türkenkriege during the Long Turkish War starting in 1593, the Grand Duchy of Tuscany sent 100,000 scudi and 3,600 soldiers (3,000 infantry and 600 cavalry) to support the Holy Roman Emperor in Hungary, plus smaller detachments thereafter (there were 2,000 Tuscans in the Imperial army in Hungary by 1601). A Tuscan-Spanish treaty that bound the two at the end of the Italian Wars demanded that Tuscany send 5,000 troops to the Spanish army if ever the Duchy of Milan or Naples was attacked. In 1613, Cosimo II sent 2,000 infantry and 300 cavalry, along with an undisclosed number of Tuscan adventurers, to aid the Spanish after Savoy launched an invasion of the Duchy of Montferrat.

In 1631, the grand duke sent 7,000 troops to join Wallenstein's army in support of the Emperor during the Thirty Years War. From 1629 to 1630 he also sent 6,000 troops to join the Spanish in the War of the Mantuan Succession, plus a naval detachment and funds to pay for 4,000 Swiss mercenaries. In 1643, during the Castro War, the Tuscan army was between 5,000 and 10,000 good troops, including foreign mercenaries but not including militia. Yves-Marie Berce figures that most of those troops were of French or Swiss origin, but Hanlon disputes this, saying that Italians comprised a larger portion, and that the specific origins of the troops have very little information to go on. He also cites the fact that many Italians served as mercenaries outside of Italy, though he admits that (other than the well-known mercenary tradition of Corsica) there is no information on their state origins. The duchy's largest military deployment came during this war, when in June 1643 over 10,000 troops (7,000 Tuscans in eight regiments of infantry recruited from militia, garrison troops, and veteran mercenaries; 1 regiment of German infantry; 2,400 cavalry, a quarter of whom were Germans; and 1 regiment of Tuscan dragoons) with 18 cannons invaded the Papal States holding of Umbria, while other troops and militia were left garrisoning the grand duchy's major citadels, coastal forts, and border forts. Militia were recruited into the army as needed to replace losses.

Tuscan forces participated in the Morean War, a theater of the Great Turkish War; Cosimo III did so partly under Habsburg demands for contributions to the war under Imperial rights. The Tuscans sent to Morea around three thousand soldiers in four contingents from 1684 to 1688, plus 14 ships and their attendant sailors (8 galleys, 4 galiots, 2 other vessels).

Tuscany's economic and military strength cratered from the second half of the 17th century onward, which was reflected in the quality of its army; by 1740 it only consisted of a few thousand poorly trained men and was considered impotent to such a degree that its Habsburgs rulers allowed enemy troops to cross the duchy unopposed.

Tuscan military capability was somewhat repaired later in the century. With the outbreak of the Seven Years' War in 1756, Emperor Francis I, who was also Grand Duke of Tuscany, demanded Tuscany send troops to aid the Imperial war effort in Silesia. Tuscany sent one regiment, initially of 3,120 men, later reinforced to replace losses. The heavy casualties of the expeditionary regiment led to further recruitment in Tuscany (both for the expeditionary force and for the three home defense regiments) and an upward surge in draft dodging. Throughout the war, the total losses of the regiment amounted to 3,011 men: 62 prisoners, 142 killed in action, 1,719 died of wounds or disease, 857 missing or deserters, and 231 discharged as invalids.

The grand duchy was conquered by the French during the Revolutionary and Napoleonic Wars, first being recreated as the French client state of Etruria in 1801 and later being directly annexed into the French Empire in 1807. Tuscany was restored to prewar status after Napoleon's defeat in 1814. Tuscany was taxed for cash, resources, and men as with all other provinces of the empire, and provided 19,000 soldiers to Napoleon's army from 1807 to 1814. (Note: Vergari 2009, p. 188: Italian: "I dati sulla partecipazione dei toscani alle guerre napoleoniche sono ancora, a nostro avviso, inattendibili. Se la cifra totale dei soldati coinvolti nella leva è abbastanza definita non sappiamo con certezza il numero dei renitenti e dei coscritti che non giunsero a destinazione. Zobi stima in circa diecimila i coscritti toscani13 ma Giorgetti ritiene la cifra sottostimata e valuta, sulla stima dei dati riportati da altre fonti14, il numero dei militari arruolati in circa 14.700 ai quali si devono aggiungere i circa 4.000 militari dell’esercito etrusco passati, nel 1807, nelle file francesi per un totale complessivo, a nostro avviso abbastanza plausibile, di circa 19.000 uomini")

=== Navy ===
The grand duchy had two sources of naval power: the state navy and the Order of Saint Stephen.

In 1572 the Tuscan navy consisted of 11 galleys, 2 galleasses, 2 galleons, 6 frigates, and various transports, carrying in all 200 guns, manned by 100 knights, 900 seamen, and 2,500 oarsmen. With the end of Spanish subsidies, in 1574 the navy shrunk to 4 galleys. Grand Duke Ferdinand I sought to expand Tuscany's naval strength during his reign, and cooperated with the Order of Saint Stephen, which often blurred the line between itself and the Tuscan navy. The Order in 1604 counted among its fleet 6 galleys, 3 roundships/bertoni, 2 transports, 1 galleon, and 1 galleass, supplemented by other ships financed by corsairs flying the Tuscan banner. Ferdinand I expanded the Tuscan fleet after expanding the arsenal at Livorno, and oversaw many raids by both the navy and Order, including on Chios in 1599 (a failure), Preveza in 1605 (5 galleys with 400 Tuscan militia; a success), various Turkish ports in 1606 (6 galleys, some roundships, and 750 Tuscan soldiers; a success), and Bone in 1607 (8 galleys, 9 bertoni, and 1 galleon, with 2,300 soldiers; a success). From 1560 to 1609, the Tuscan fleet captured 76 galiots, 7 galleys, 2 large roundships, and 67 minor craft, taking 9,620 slaves and liberating 2,076 Christians. The preponderance of small vessels among the prizes indicates that most of the trophies were easy victories.

The Tuscans were early pioneers in the deployment of roundships, as technology made manpower-heavy galleys less efficient. They launched several big ships at Portoferraio after 1601, with an armament of 40 guns each yet only 60 seamen each. 8 of them around 1610 floated a total of 200 guns. They began to raid independently of the galleys on long voyages to the Levant. In 1608, they intercepted a Turkish convoy of 42 vessels off Rhodes, seizing 9 and netting 600 slaves and a booty of 1 million ducats, equivalent to two years of revenue for the whole grand duchy. Under Grand Duke Cosimo II, 7 roundships carrying 1,800 soldiers were sent to the Mediterranean from 1609 to 1611. This expedition was less successful, costing 800 men and 4 ships disabled. The grand duke also enticed English corsairs in North Africa to use Livorno as a base instead, in exchange for amnesty and a share of their profits; Livorno quickly became a corsair capital, with the corsairs preying on both Muslim and Christian shipping.

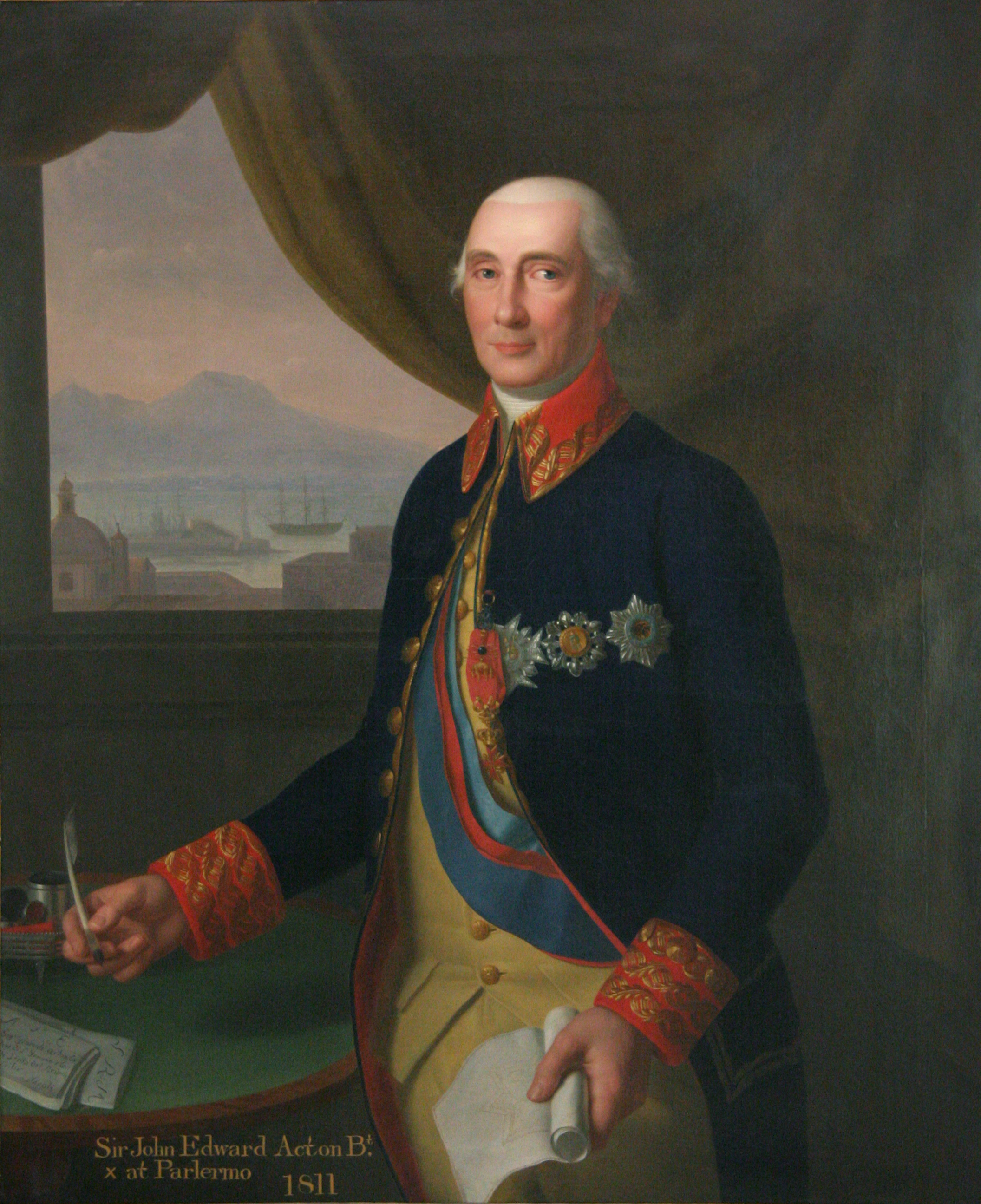
Sir John Acton, who served as admiral of the Tuscan Navy (1776–1779)

After 1612, the Tuscans progressively stopped sending out expeditions and limited their naval operations to patrols. This can be observed in the register of prizes of the Order of Saint Stephen. It lists some 238 vessels captured from 1563 to 1688; enemy galleys captured from 1568 to 1599 were 11 (for the loss of an identical number), and another 17 were seized between 1602 and 1635. Only 1 was captured after 1635. A notable incident in this time was a naval battle off Sardinia in October 1624, in which 15 Tuscan, Papal, and Neapolitan galleys converged on a flotilla of 5 Algerian pirate vessels (including a large flagship). In the 10-hour battle, punctuated by cannon fire and boarding actions, 600 pirates were killed or captured and they lost 4 of the 5 ships (3 sunk, 1 captured), while the Italians lost 60 dead.

In 1686, Tuscany sent 10 vessels carrying 870 soldiers to participate in the Morean War (a battalion of 400 Tuscans were already serving there). In 1687 the Tuscans sent an additional 4 galleys, plus 2 hired foreign galleys, carrying 860 more soldiers, including German mercenaries. In 1688, another 6 galleys and 860 soldiers joined. All three contingents suffered high casualties, a third for the first two and over half for the third.

== Flags and coats of arms ==
House of Medici

Flag of Grand Duchy of Tuscany
(1562–1737)

Coat of arms
(1562–1737)

Naval flag
(16th century–1737)

Civil ensign
(17th century–1737)
House of Habsburg-Lorraine (Tuscany)

Imperial Banner of the HRE as state/naval flag
(1749–1765)

State flag with Lesser Coat of arms
(1815–1848, 1849–1860)

State flag with Great Coat of arms
(1765–1800, 1815–1848, 1849–1860)

Flag of the Grand Duchy of Tuscany
(1848–1849)

Lesser Coat of arms
(1815–1848, 1849–1860)

Great Coat of arms
(1765–1800, 1815–1848, 1849–1860)

Naval flag
(1737–1749)

Civil flag and civil ensign
(1815–1848, 1849–1860)

== See also ==
- History of Tuscany
- List of grand dukes of Tuscany
- List of Tuscan consorts
- Grand Prince of Tuscany
- Grand Princesses of Tuscany
- Tuscan Penal Code of 1853

== Bibliography ==
- Acton, Harold Mario Mitchell (1980). The Last Medici. London: Macmillan. ISBN 978-0-333-29315-7.
- Belmonte Hernández, Sergio (2022). "La política matrimonial Habsburgo-Borbón tras la Reversión de Alianzas: Los enlaces matrimoniales de la infanta María Luisa de Borbón con Pedro Leopoldo de Habsburgo y de la princesa María Luisa de Parma con el príncipe de Asturias, don Carlos de Borbón" (PDF). Investigaciones Históricas, época moderna y contemporánea (in Spanish). 42 (42): 577–614. doi:10.24197/ihemc.42.2022.577-614.
- Booth, Cecily (1921). Cosimo I, Duke of Florence. Cambridge: Cambridge University Press – via Internet Archive.
- Bowring, John (1839). "Report on the Grand Duchy of Tuscany". Parliamentary Papers. Vol. 16. H.M. Stationery Office.
- Cipriani, Giovanni (2014). "Chapter III. Dal 27 Aprile 1859 alla II Guerra di Indipendenza". Una battaglia politica internazionale. Il tormentato cammino verso l'unità italiana 1846-1860 (PDF) (in Italian). Florence: Nicomp L.E. pp. 123–164. ISBN 978-88-97142-43-0.
- Da Passano, Mario (1999). "La pena di morte nel Regno d'Italia (1859-1889)". Diritto penale dell'Ottocento. I codici preunitari e il codice Zanardelli (in Italian). Studies coordinated by Sergio Vinciguerra. Padova: Cedam. p. 611 e ss.
- Delbrück, Hans (1990) [1920]. History of the Art of War. Vol. 4: The Dawn of Modern Warfare. Translated by Renfroe, Walter J. Lincoln, Neb: University of Nebraska Press/ Bison Book. ISBN 978-0-8032-9199-7.
- Duffy, Christopher (2023). Austrian Army in the Seven Years War. Vol. II: By Force of Arms. Helion and Company.
- Fisher, H. A. L. (1906). "The French Dependencies, and Switzerland, 1800–14". In Ward, A. W.; Prothero, G. W.; Leathes, Stanley (eds.). The Cambridge Modern History. Vol. IX: Napoleon. Cambridge University Press.
- Frieda, Leonie (2003). Catherine de Medici: Renaissance Queen of France. London: Phoenix. ISBN 978-0-7538-2039-1.
- Hale, J. R. (2001) [1977]. Florence and the Medici (New ed.). London: Phoenix. ISBN 978-1-84212-456-7.
- Hanlon, Gregory (1998). The Twilight Of A Military Tradition: Italian Aristocrats And European Conflicts, 1560-1800. London: Taylor and Francis. ISBN 978-1-85728-704-2.
- Jackson, Guida M. (2003). Women Rulers Throughout the Ages: An Illustrated Guide. Santa Barbara: ABC-CLIO. ISBN 978-1-57607-091-8.
- Mancini, Pasquale S. (1872). "Contro la pretesa necessità della conservazione della pena di morte in Italia" [Against the alleged need for the preservation of the death penalty in Italy]. Primo Congresso Giuridico Italiano in Roma. Relazione sulla Tesi I.ª Abolizione della pena di morte e proposta di una scala penale [First Italian Legal Congress in Rome. Report on the Thesis I.a Abolition of the death penalty and proposal of a criminal scale] (in Italian). Roma: Pallotta. pp. 1–102.
- Mora, George (1959). "Vincenzo Chiarugi (1759-1820) and his Psychiatric Reform in Florence in the Late 18th Century: (On the Occasion of the Bi-centenary of his Birth)". Journal of the History of Medicine and Allied Sciences. 14 (4): 424–433. ISSN 0022-5045. JSTOR 24620719.
- Strathern, Paul (2007) [2003]. The Medici: Godfathers of the Renaissance (Reprint ed.). Vintage Books. ISBN 9780099522973.
- Vergari, Danielle (2009). "La partecipazione dei soldati toscani alle campagne napoleoniche attraverso la documentazione della medaglia di Sant'Elena" [The participation of Tuscan soldiers in the Napoleonic campaigns through the documentation of the medal of St. Helena]. In Coturri, Paolo (ed.). Partire partirò, partir bisogna: Firenze e la Toscana nelle campagne napoleoniche, 1793-1815 [Florence and Tuscany in the Napoleonic countryside, 1793-1815] (in Italian). Firenze: Sarnus. ISBN 978-88-563-0021-5.
- Whaley, Joachim (2012). Germany and the Holy Roman Empire. Vol. II: The Peace of Westphalia to the Dissolution of the Reich, 1648–1806. Oxford: Oxford University Press. ISBN 978-0-19-873101-6.
- Woolrych, Humphry William (1832). The History and Results of the Present Capital Punishments in England; to which are Added, Full Tables of Convictions, Executions, Etc. London: Saunders and Benning.
