= Treaty of Aranjuez (1801) =

1801 treaty between France and Spain

- Italy 1796 (simplified); note Duchies of Parma (light green) and Tuscany (yellow)
- Context: Confirmation of the Third Treaty of San Ildefonso; Spain agrees to transfer Louisiana to France in exchange for six ships of the line, and territories in Italy
- Signed: 21 March 1801
- Location: Aranjuez, Spain
- Negotiators: (French First Republic) Lucien Bonaparte; Manuel Godoy
- Parties: France; Spain

The Treaty of Aranjuez (1801) was signed on 21 March 1801 between France and Spain. It confirmed a previous secret agreement in which Spain agreed to exchange Louisiana for territories in Tuscany. The treaty also stipulated Spain's cession of Louisiana to be a "restoration", not a retrocession.

Napoleon wanted Louisiana as the hub of a new French empire in North America, to replace that lost after the 1763 Treaty of Paris. While Spanish chief minister Manuel Godoy was happy to transfer the territory, he demanded six French ships of the line and compensation in Italy to make it politically acceptable to Charles IV of Spain.

Terms were agreed in the October 1800 Third Treaty of San Ildefonso but kept secret, as French Foreign Minister Talleyrand was negotiating the Convention of 1800 with the United States, which was deeply concerned by French ambitions in North America. He was also proposing to compensate Spain with territories France did not yet control. This was achieved by the February 1801 Treaty of Lunéville agreed with Austria, and the Treaty of Florence signed with the Kingdom of Naples on 28 March 1801.

Talleyrand used the treaties to create the Kingdom of Etruria for Charles IV's son-in-law Louis I, and in return Spain announced the transfer of Louisiana. However, these arrangements proved short-lived; France sold Louisiana to the US in 1803, while Etruria was dissolved in 1807.

== Background ==
The Treaty of Aranjuez was public confirmation of the October 1800 secret Third Treaty of San Ildefonso, one of a series of agreements negotiated by French Foreign Minister Talleyrand; another was the September Convention of 1800, ending the Quasi-War with the United States. Central to this was the transfer of Spain's Louisiana territory to France, and the creation of a new French empire in North America, to replace that lost in 1763.

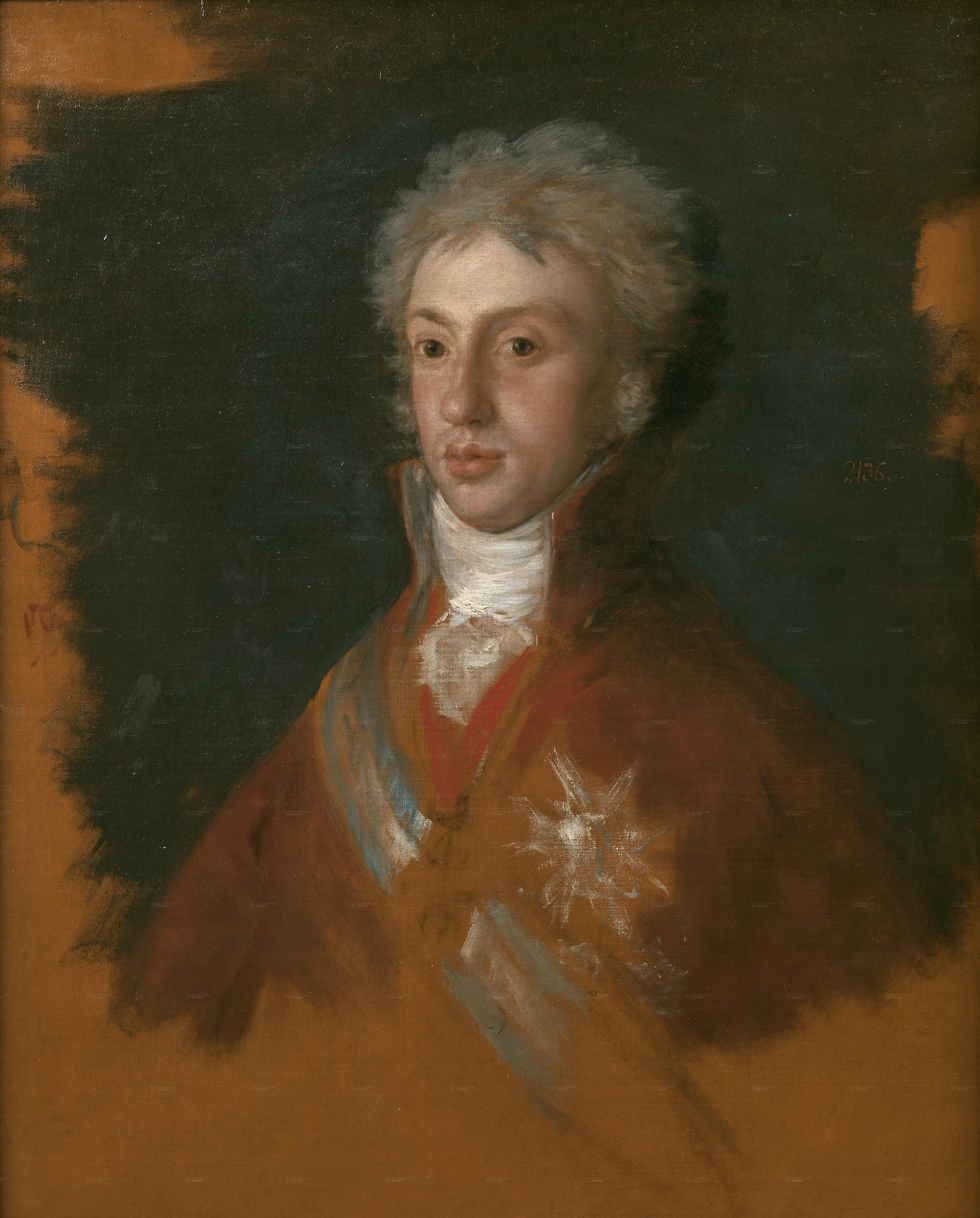
Louis I of Etruria, younger son of Ferdinand of Parma, and son-in-law of Charles IV of Spain

After the November 1799 Coup of 18 Brumaire, the new government of First Consul Napoleon and his deputy Talleyrand made colonial expansion a key policy. The coup was partially financed by wealthy merchants, who wanted to re-establish control of sugar-producing islands in the Caribbean. These were extremely profitable; prior to the abolition of slavery in 1793, the French colony of Saint-Domingue produced more sugar and coffee than all the British West Indies combined.

For Napoleon, Louisiana was to serve as the hub of this new empire, as well as a source of food and slaves for French plantations in the West Indies. A recent addition to the immense Spanish Empire in the Americas, possession brought Spain into conflict with the United States, whose western expansion required access to the Mississippi River and the port of New Orleans. American settlers had been moving into this area for decades, despite diplomatic efforts to manage it, such as the 1795 Pinckney's Treaty. By 1800, nearly 400,000 or 7.3% of Americans lived in trans-Appalachian territories, including the new states of Kentucky and Tennessee.

At the same time, Spain's alliance with France and the resulting 1798-1802 Anglo-Spanish War led to a British naval blockade that severely impacted their economy. This was highly dependent on trade with its South American colonies, particularly the import of silver from Mexico. Conflict over American encroachment was both costly and potentially damaging, since Spain relied on American ships to evade the British blockade.

These factors made transferring Louisiana attractive to Spanish chief minister Manuel Godoy, but he needed it to be politically acceptable to Charles IV of Spain. Charles' wife Maria Luisa of Parma was the sister of Ferdinand of Parma, whose Duchy of Parma had been occupied by France since 1796; to compensate, Talleyrand proposed creating a kingdom for Louis, younger son of Ferdinand, and nephew of Maria Luisa. Since the territories Talleyrand proposed to exchange were held by Austria and the Kingdom of Naples respectively, it required the negotiation of a series of interlocking agreements.

== Provisions ==
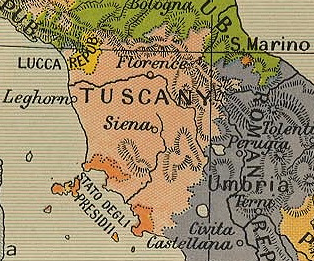
The Presidi (top) and the Principality of Piombino (below) in orange

The terms of the treaty were vague, Clause II stating 'it may consist of the Grand Duchy of Tuscany...or the three Roman legations or of any other continental provinces of Italy which form a rounded state;' Spain would hand over Louisiana once this was confirmed.

When Austria and France made peace in the February 1801 Treaty of Lunéville, one provision forced Ferdinand III, Grand Duke of Tuscany to exchange his Italian duchy for the German Electorate of Salzburg and Berchtesgaden Provostry. Ferdinand of Parma, brother-in-law of Charles IV, then formally ceded his Duchy of Parma to France, although he was allowed to keep it until his death in October 1802.

In the March 1801 Treaty of Florence, Naples transferred the Principality of Piombino and State of the Presidi in southern Tuscany to France. Talleyrand kept the Presidi, then combined Piombino with the Duchy of Tuscany to form the new Kingdom of Etruria for Louis.

== Aftermath ==
Negotiations between France and Britain to end the War of the Second Coalition resulted in the March 1802 Treaty of Amiens; although widely viewed as a short-lived truce, it gave Napoleon an opportunity to activate his plans for North America. In December 1801, 30,000 veteran French troops landed on Saint-Domingue; shortly after, Spain confirmed the transfer of Louisiana to France.

The presence of French troops in the Caribbean caused great concern in the US, but by October 1802, it was clear the expedition was a catastrophic failure; its leader, General Charles Leclerc died of yellow fever, along with an estimated 22,000 of his men. Without Saint-Domingue, Napoleon concluded Louisiana was irrelevant, and with France and Britain once again on the verge of hostilities, he decided to sell the territory to prevent it from being annexed by British forces garrisoned in nearby Canada. In April 1803, the US purchased the territory for $15 million, or 80 million francs.

The elaborate shuffling of Italian territories ultimately led nowhere. Etruria was dissolved and incorporated into France in 1807, while much of pre-Napoleonic Italy was restored by the Congress of Vienna in 1815, including the Grand Duchies of Tuscany and Parma.

== Sources ==
- Berte-Langereau, Jack (1955). "L'Espagne et le royaume d'Etrurie". Hispania (in French). 15 (60).
- Eclov, Jon Paul (2013). Informal Alliance: Royal Navy And U.S. Navy Co-Operation Against Republican France During The Quasi-War And Wars Of The French Revolution (PhD). University of North Dakota.
- Esdaile, Charles (14 June 2003). The Peninsular War: A New History. Palgrave Macmillan. ISBN 978-1-4039-6231-7.
- History.com Editors. "French Foreign Minister Talleyrand offers to sell Louisiana Territory to U.S." History.com.
- Irwin, Douglas; Sylla, Richard (2010). Founding Choices: American Economic Policy in the 1790s. University of Chicago Press. ISBN 978-0-226-38475-7.
- Kemp, Roger, ed. (2010). Documents of American Democracy. McFarland & Co. ISBN 978-0786442102.
- King, Rufus. "Madison Papers; To James Madison from Rufus King, 29 March 1801". Founders Archives. Original source: The Papers of James Madison, Secretary of State Series, vol. 1, 4 March–31 July 1801.
- Maltby, William (2008). The Rise and Fall of the Spanish Empire. Palgrave. ISBN 978-1403917928.
- McLynn, Frank (1997). Napoleon; a biography. Jonathan Cape. ISBN 978-0224040723.
- Rodriguez, Junius P (2002). The Louisiana Purchase: A Historical and Geographical Encyclopedia. ABC-CLIO.
- Sánchez, Rafael Torres (2015). Constructing a Fiscal Military State in Eighteenth Century Spain. Palgrave Macmillan. ISBN 978-1137478658.
- Stearns, Peter N.; Langer, William Leonard (2001). The Encyclopedia of world history: ancient, medieval, and modern. Houghton Mifflin Harcourt. ISBN 0-395-65237-5.
- Tarver, Micheal; Slape, Emily (2016). The Spanish Empire; An Historical Encyclopedia. ABC-CLIO. ISBN 978-1610694216.
