= Kingdom of Etruria =

1801–1807 French client state in Italy

Kingdom of Etruria Regno di Etruria (Italian)
- 1801–1807
- Flag Coats of arms

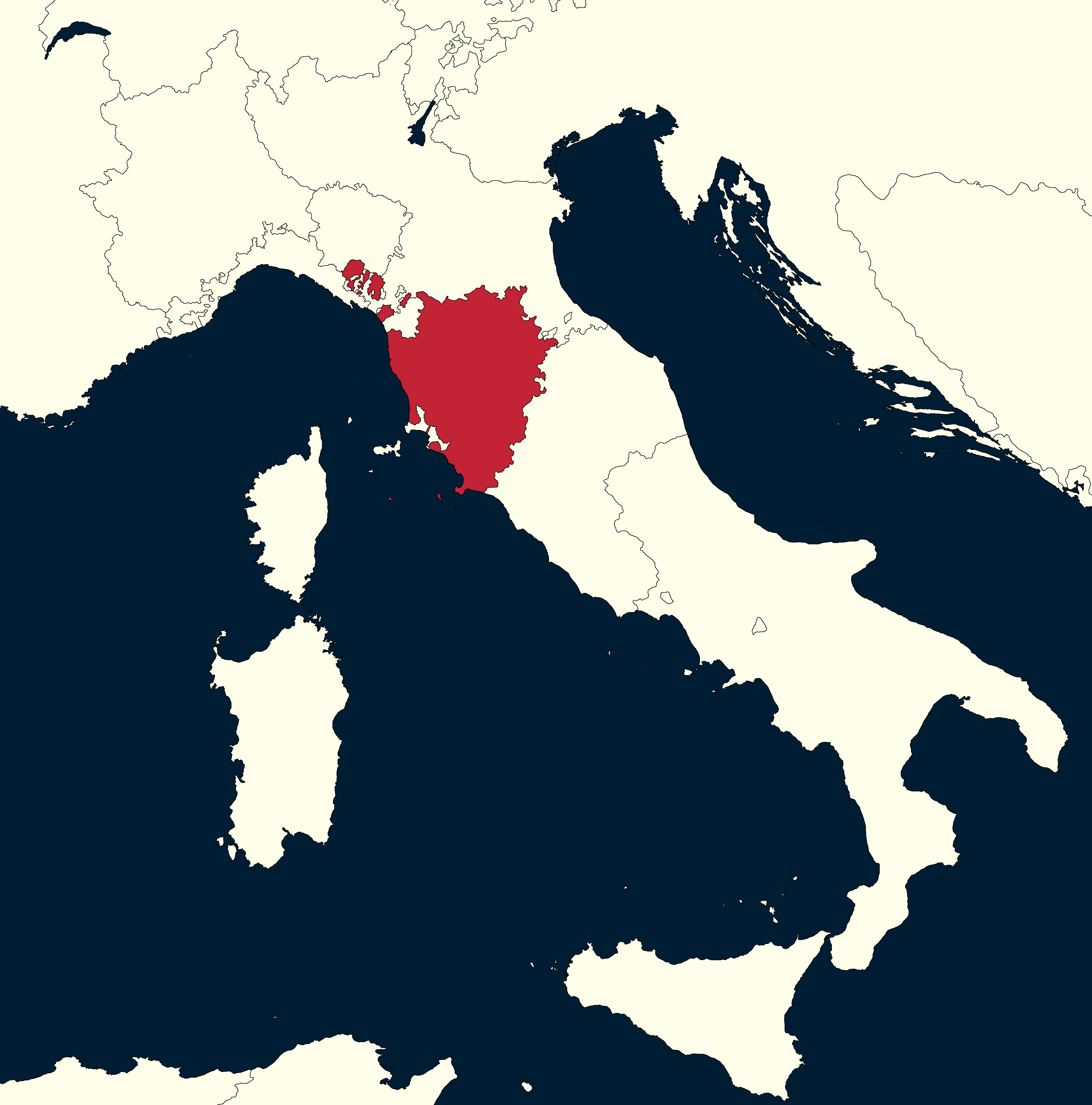
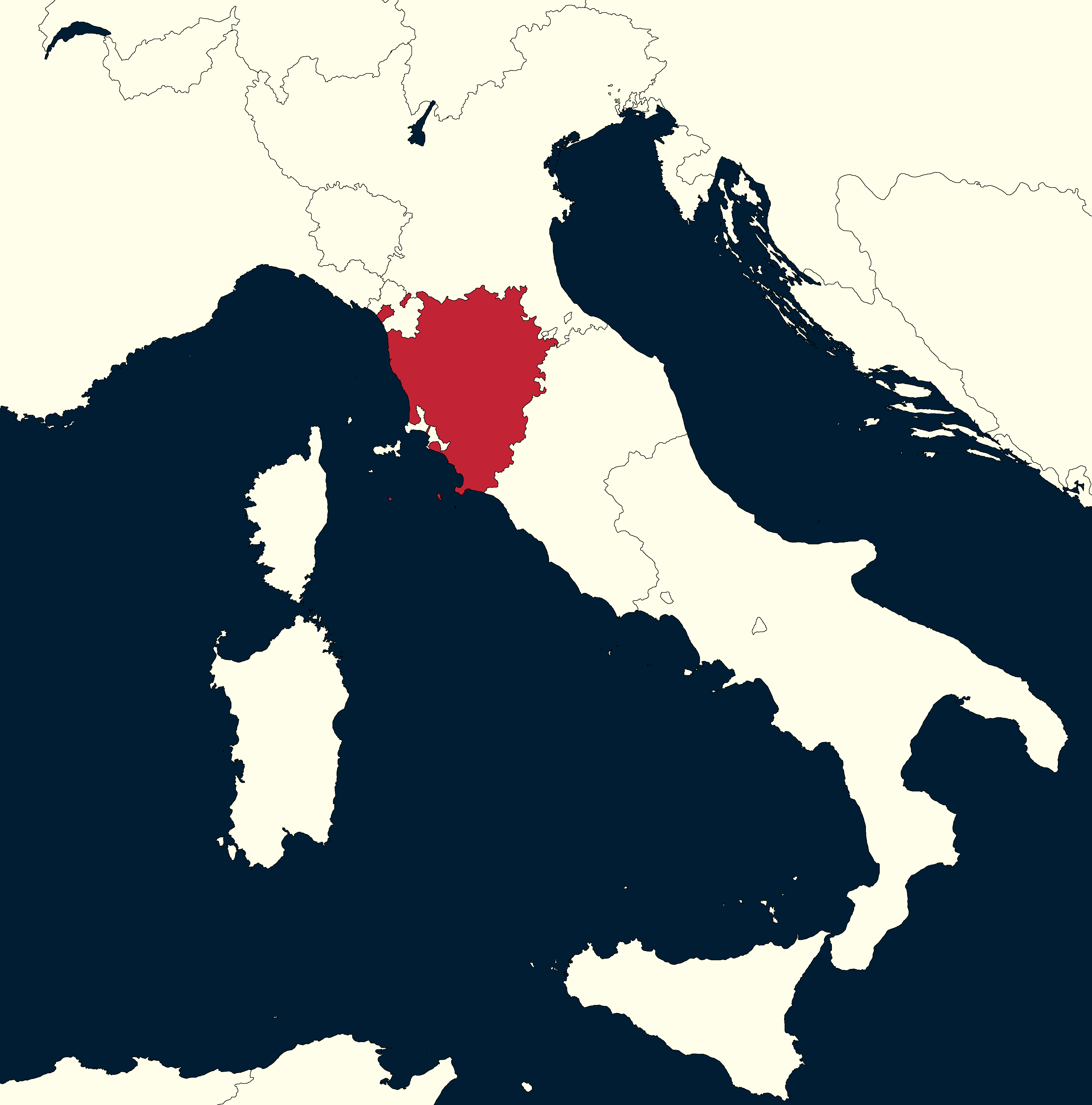
- Status: Client state of the French Empire
- Capital: Florence
- Common languages: Italian
- Religion: Christian (Roman Catholic)
- Government: Monarchy
- King
  - 1801–1803: Louis I
  - 1803–1807: Charles Louis
- Regent
  - 1803–1807: Maria Luisa
- Historical era: Napoleonic Wars
  - Established: March 21, 1801
  - Disestablished: December 10, 1807

Area
  - 1808: 5,850 sq mi (15,200 km^{2})

Population
  - 1808: 1,050,000
- Currency: Tuscan pound
Preceded by
| Grand Duchy of Tuscany |
| State of the Presidi |
Succeeded by
| Arno |
| Méditerranée |
| Ombrone |

The Kingdom of Etruria (/ɪˈtrʊəriə/ ih-TROOR-ee-ə; Italian: Regno di Etruria) was an Italian kingdom between 1801 and 1807 that made up a large part of modern Tuscany. It took its name from Etruria, the old Roman name for the land of the Etruscans.

== History ==
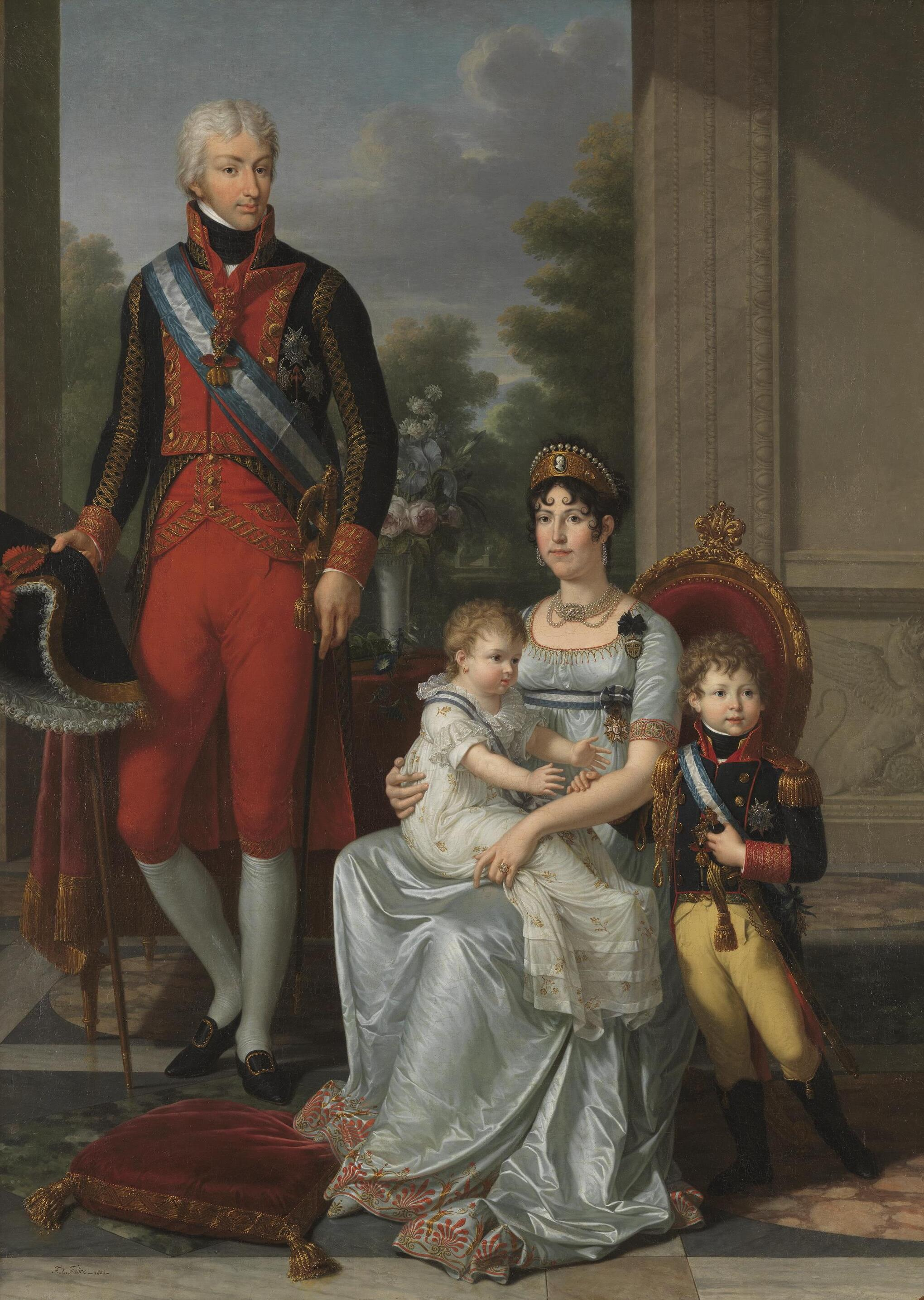
Etrurian royal family (François-Xavier Fabre, 1804): Louis I, Maria Luisa (holding Maria Luisa Carlota) and Charles Louis.

The kingdom was created by the Treaty of Aranjuez, signed at Aranjuez, Spain on 21 March 1801. In the context of a larger agreement between Napoleonic France and Spain, the Bourbons of Parma were compensated for the loss of their territory in northern Italy (which had been occupied by French troops since 1796). The King of Spain decided that his cousin Ferdinand, Duke of Parma had to cede his duchy to France, and in return his son Louis I was granted the Kingdom of Etruria (which was created from the Grand Duchy of Tuscany). Shortly after Ferdinand refused to leave, he suddenly died in suspect circumstances. To make way for the Bourbons, the Habsburg Grand Duke of Tuscany Ferdinand III was ousted and compensated with the Electorate of Salzburg by the Treaty of Lunéville.

Outside the Treaty of Aranjuez, Spain also secretly agreed to retrocede the Louisiana territory (over 2 million square kilometers) back to France in order to secure the Kingdom of Etruria as a client state for Spain; Louisiana was first ceded by France to Spain in 1763 at the end of the Seven Years' War. Louisiana was duly transferred to France on 15 October 1802, after the signing of the Treaty of Aranjuez. Napoleon subsequently sold Louisiana to the United States in the Louisiana Purchase on April 30, 1803, in order to pay for his French armies during the War of the Third Coalition.

The first king (Louis I) died young in 1803, and his underage son Charles Louis succeeded him. His mother, Maria Luisa of Spain, was appointed regent. However, since Etruria was troubled with smuggling and espionage, Napoleon annexed the territory, thus it was the last non-Bonaparte Italian kingdom on the Peninsula to be absorbed into the French Empire. Since Spain's only hope of compensation lay in Portugal, co-operation with the emperor became more important.

The kingdom had a small army of 4,000 men in 1807. Prior to its dissolution, Queen-Regent Maria Luisa had called for a levy of 20,000 soldiers to fully populate the Etrurian Army. There existed at minimum twenty-six units on roster, including the then-named Compagnia Dragoni d'Etruria and various formations of infantry, artillery, cavalry, and militia.

In 1807, Napoleon dissolved the kingdom and integrated it into France, turning it into three French departments: Arno, Méditerranée and Ombrone. Its soldiers were integrated directly into the French army, which recruited additional men from these departments thereafter. The king and his mother were promised the throne of a new Kingdom of Northern Lusitania (in northern Portugal), but this plan was never realized due to the break between Napoleon and the Spanish Bourbons in 1808. After Napoleon's downfall in 1814, Tuscany was restored to its Habsburg grand dukes. In 1815, the Duchy of Lucca was carved out of Tuscany, on the lands of the former Republic of Lucca, as compensation for the Bourbons of Parma until they resumed their rule in 1847. As stipulated in the Treaty of Paris of 1817, in execution of the art. 99 of the Final Act of the Congress of Vienna, the Duchy of Lucca was then annexed by the Grand Duchy of Tuscany.

== Flags and coats of arms ==
Flags

State flag with the greater coat of arms

State flag with the lesser coat of arms

Merchant flag with the lesser coat of arms

Merchant flag (used by little tonnage ships)
Coat of arms

Greater coat of arms

Middle coat of arms

Lesser coat of arms
