= Florentine military reforms =

The military reforms of the Florentine Republic were initiated by Florentine politician and political theorist Niccolò Machiavelli during the short-lived Republic of Florence that lasted from 1498 to 1512 under the priest Girolamo Savonarola. In the pursuit of the republican spirit which pervaded Florence at the time, Machiavelli sought to establish a military establishment that was similar to that of ancient Rome. He was specifically focused upon the establishment of an army possessed with the discipline of the Roman legions. He sought to establish a citizen-infantry capable of taking the field against the Italian Condottieri of the day, who largely terrorized the peninsula, in addition to the chronic foreign invasions which occurred on a regular basis at this time. Broadly speaking Machiavelli would institute a series of reforms in 1506 that would create a citizen army of 20,000 men, and establish a system that would keep this citizen army in a state of readiness.

== Impetus for reforms ==
Prior to Machiavelli's birth, Italy had been dominated by foreign kings or divided into independent duchies under the influence of the Condottieri for some time. Italy had experienced numerous revolutions. Before the Italian Wars, it had been the domain of the Holy Roman Emperors and numerous wars which seeking to take back control of Northern Italy. The independent states in Italy, lacking proper armies to field, resorted to the use of mercenaries. These caused numerous problems and Machiavelli placed no trust in these forces. He said of them at a later date: "The ruin of Italy has been caused by nothing else than by resting all her hopes for many years on mercenaries... when foreigners came they showed what they were"

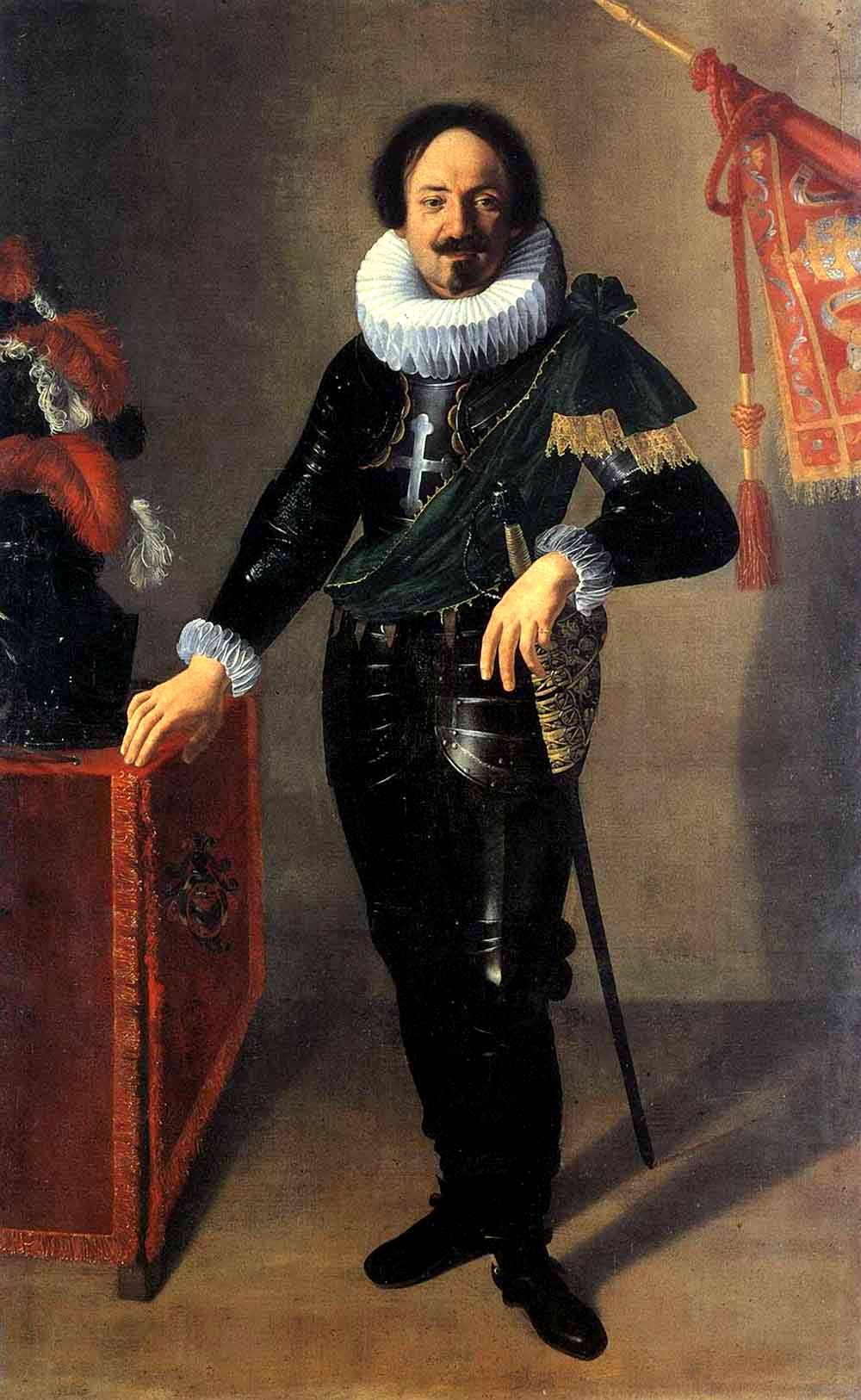
A 17th-century Condottiere, by Artemisia Gentileschi

For centuries Italy had been dominated by the Kings of France, Germany, Spain, and countless dukes and princes of German and French origin.

== Machiavelli's position within Florence ==
Machiavelli is primarily known for his political discourses such as The Prince and The Art of War, but he was also a middle-ranking official of the Florentine Republic. His position allowed him access to prominent officials and assemblies, and the opportunity to persuade them to implement his reforms.

== Reforms ==
First of all, the Florentine Republic was divided into a series of districts. The purpose of this being to have government officials travel through each district and point out men of suitable bodily strength in order that they may serve. Each man was issued a weapon – a spear and a body harness – that was a uniform in the Florentine fashion. This was entirely consistent with Machiavelli's later beliefs on the subject of native strength. Each unit was assigned a captain, who was assigned a "chancellor" to perform the administrative tasks such as ensuring all correspondence was taken care of, keeping rosters, and things of that nature. In addition, several corporals were assigned to aid the captain.

=== Unit Hierarchy ===
Each unit had a roster strength of 800 men, with 150 men serving at any given time:

- Captain: the man in command of the unit, rotated amongst the districts
- Chancellors: performed administrative duties
- Corporals: assisted the Captain in command of the unit.
- Rank and file

70% of these men were armed with pikes, 10% were marksmen, and the remaining 20% were issued halberds, hog-spears, or other close combat weapons.

== Problems with reforms ==
There were a number of problems with the reforms. From the start, Machiavelli expressed concern that the military establishment would undermine the interests of the Florentine Republic. There was only a small area outside of the city proper which Florence had much confidence in the populace's loyalty. The rest of Florence's territory had been reduced into submission by force, and could easily revolt again. Some of the fundamental premises of his citizen army were flawed.

Furthermore, captains of the units were constantly being rotated out of their units because there was fear for the Republic itself. Thus there was a relative lack of confidence in the officers by the rank and file. Furthermore, the captains had no authority to discipline their soldiers. One memorandum said:

In consideration of the small compensation that our enlisted men receive for their trouble and discomfort in their training as members of the militia, we desire that they be treated humanely and corrected in a kind manner whenever in drill they make a mistake as a result of their inexperience. We desire this so that they will carry through with this work all the more gladly and with joyous harts. For from the foregoing consideration, we consider this means to be the most effective to maintain their obedience and positive attitude toward this training. It appears to us that to bully and irritate them would serve to produce the exact opposite. For this reason we have wished to exhort you to deal with them in a kindly manner and to take this trouble to maintain a good attitude in them. You must be careful to avoid everything that you know or believe could cause any kind of incident.

On a deeper level, a citizen of the Roman Republic, during its slow rise under persistent defensive threat, in an agrarian society, differed greatly from a citizen of the short-lived Florentine Republic, which had already become an urban center with important commercial life and without any tradition of the discipline and sternness. The materiel and temperament of a Florentine citizen army doomed the attempt to achieve anything akin the fabled legions of the past.
