= History of Tuscany =

This article deals with the history of Tuscany.

Tuscany is named after its pre-Roman inhabitants, the Etruscans. It was ruled by Rome for many centuries. In the Middle Ages, it saw many invasions, but in the Renaissance period it helped lead Europe back to civilization. Later, it settled down as a grand duchy. It was conquered by Napoleonic France in the late 18th century and became part of the Kingdom of Italy in the 19th century.

== Apennine, Proto-Villanovan and Villanovan culture ==
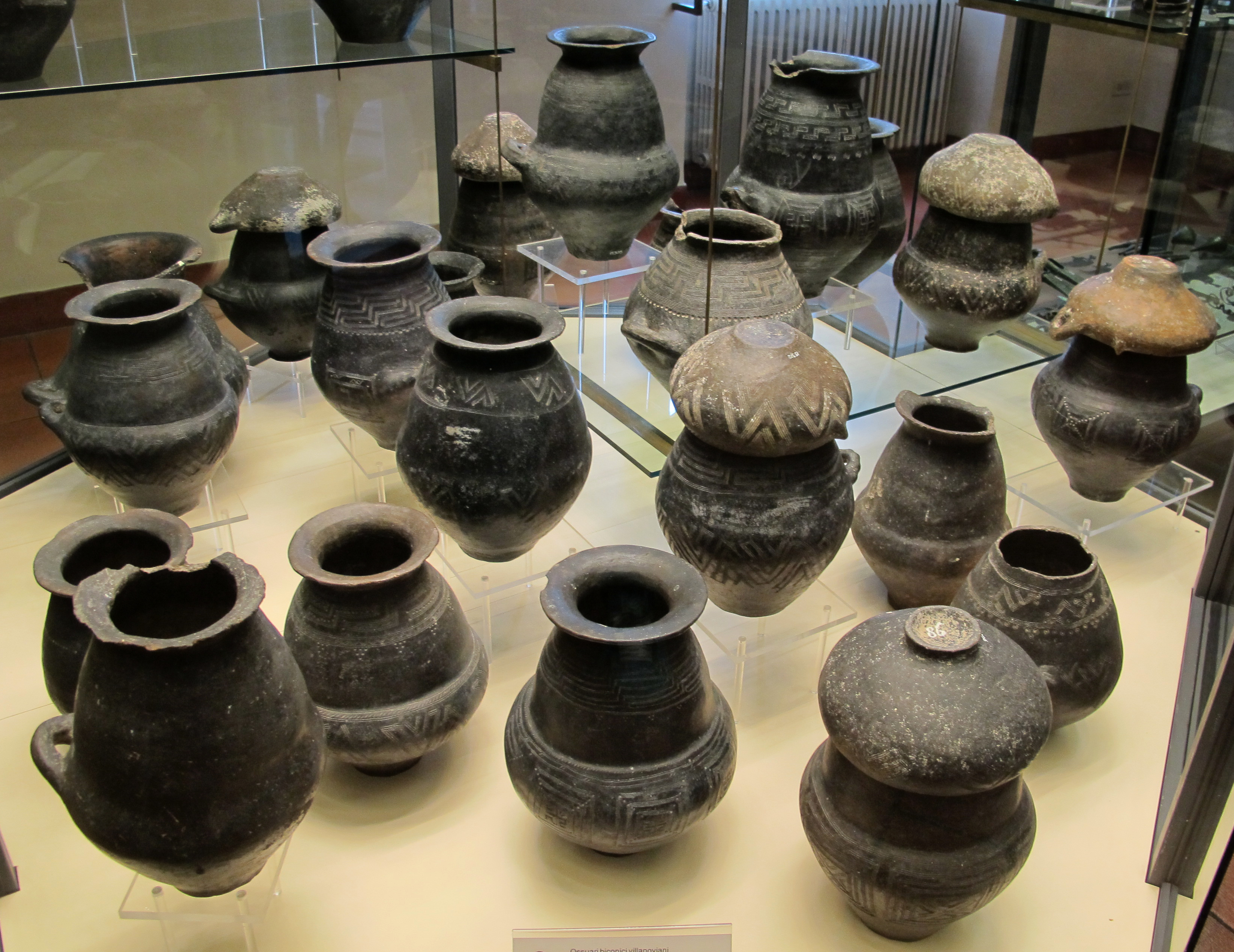
Cinerary urns of the Villanovan culture

The pre-Etruscan history of the area in the middle and late Bronze parallels that of the archaic Greeks. The Tuscan area was inhabited by peoples of the so-called Apennine culture in the second millennium BC (roughly 1400–1150 BC) who had trading relationships with the Minoan and Mycenaean civilizations in the Aegean Sea, and, at the end of the Bronze Age, by peoples of the so-called of the Proto-Villanovan culture (c. 1100-900 BC) part of the central European Urnfield culture system. Following this, at the beginning of the Iron Age, the Villanovan culture (c. 900–700 BC), regarded as the oldest phase of Etruscan civilization, saw Tuscany, and the rest of Etruria, taken over by chiefdoms. City-states developed in the late Villanovan (paralleling Greece and the Aegean) before "Orientalization" occurred.

== Etruscan period ==
The Etruscans were the first major civilization in this region; large enough to lay down a transport infrastructure, implement agriculture and mining, and produce vivid art. The Etruscans lived in Etruria well into prehistory. The civilization grew to fill the area between the Arno River and Tiber River from the 10th century, reaching their peak during the 7th century BC and 6th century BC, finally succumbing to the Romans by the first century. Despite being seen as distinct in its manners and customs by contemporary Greeks, the cultures of Greece, and later Rome, influenced the civilisation to a great extent. One reason for its eventual demise was this increasing absorption by surrounding cultures, including the adoption of the Etruscan upper class by the Romans.

== Roman period ==
Soon after absorbing Etruria, Rome established the cities of Lucca, Pisa, Siena, and Florence, endowed the area with new technologies and development, and ensured peace. These developments included extensions of existing roads, introduction of aqueducts and sewers, and the construction of many buildings, both public and private. The Roman civilization in the West collapsed in the fifth century and the region was left to the Goths, and others. In the sixth century, the Longobards arrived and designated Lucca the capital of their Duchy of Tuscia.

== Middle Ages ==
After the fall of the Western Roman Empire the region went under the Ostrogoth and Byzantine dominations, before the Lombard conquest in 569. Tuscany was made a Duchy, known as Duchy of Tuscia, having its seat in Lucca. After the destruction of the Lombard kingdom by Charlemagne, it became a county first, and then a march. In the 11th century the marquisate went to the Attoni family from Canossa, who also held Modena, Reggio Emilia and Mantua. Matilda of Canossa was their most famous member.

In this period Tuscany acquired many castles, abbeys and monasteries, while the main towns started again to grow demographically, turning themselves into communes mostly independent from the Holy Roman Empire. Lucca was in fact the first commune in Italy; the other most important ones were Arezzo, Florence, Siena and Pisa, often struggling between each other. The south of current Tuscany (roughly identifiable with the modern province of Grosseto) was instead a feudal dominion of the Aldobrandeschi family.

Pilgrims travelling along the Via Francigena between Rome and France brought wealth and development during the Middle Ages. The food and shelter required by these travellers fuelled the growth of communities around churches and taverns.

In the 11th century Pisa became the most powerful of them, building a trade (as well as colonial) empire in the Mediterranean and playing a key role in the Crusades. Banking, soon turned into an international activity with branches in Flanders, France and England, was instead the main resource of Florence, Siena and Lucca. The latter was also an important center for silk production.

Pisa began to decline in the 13th/14th centuries after its defeat by Genoa at the Battle of Meloria. After its conquest of Arezzo and Pisa, by the early 15th century Florence had gained a prominent role in Tuscany, as well as in Italy, and was also the cultural capital of the region. Its only remaining rival in Tuscany was Siena.

== Republican governments, c. 1000–1805 ==
Civil flag of the Florentine Republic

=== Republic of Pisa, c. 1000–1406 ===
From its creation to the year 1189, the republic was governed by consuls. From 1190 the Republic of Pisa adopted the Podestà as its head of state; however, for some periods citizens elected as consuls also operated. In 1254, after a popular revolt, the maritime republic held the creation of the captaincy and the "council of the elders", but the most important institutional figure remained that of the podestà.

=== Republic of Florence, 1115–1434 ===
Before becoming a de facto monarchy ruled by the powerful Medici family, the Florentine Republic adopted various forms of republican government. In 1172 the Florentines elected their first Consuls: Giovanni di Uguccione Giandonati, Importuno, Truffetto dei Fifanti and Ormanno Caponsacchi. While in 1207 it was elected their first Podestà, Gualfredotto Grasselli. In 1293 the republic elected its first Gonfaloniere of Justice, Giano della Bella. Republican rule came to an end with the arrival of the Medici to power in 1434, with Cosimo de' Medici as the first Lord of the city-state.

=== Republic of Siena, 1125–1555 ===
Following the deposition of the bishop who governed the city, the Sienese elected the consuls as the first head of state. In 1199 they held the election of their first Podestà, while in the following centuries the governments were led by members of the council of the Republic, the most notable being the Noveschi. From a short period, from 1399 to 1404 it was also ruled by the Visconti of Milan. The republican government was suppressed for good with the Siena's loss of independence to the then increasingly powerful Florentine Republic.

=== Republic of Lucca, 1160–1805 ===
The Republic of Lucca, the only republic which managed to remain independent until the early modern period in the history of Tuscany, and along with Genoa and Venice, in the history of Italy, it was consequently one of the most enduring states of all Italian city-states. The republic, was ruled by the Gonfaloniere, and its deliberative bodies were the ''Maggior Consiglio'' (Great Council), the ''Minor Consiglio'' (Minor Council) and the Council of the Elders (with ten members).

== Renaissance period ==
Though "Tuscany" remained a linguistic, cultural and geographic conception, rather than a political reality, in the 15th century, Florence extended dominion in Tuscany through the annexion of Arezzo in 1384, the purchase of Pisa in 1405 and the suppression of a local resistance there (1406). Livorno was bought in 1421 and become the harbour of Florence.

In the leading city of Florence, the republic was from 1434 onward dominated by the increasingly monarchical Medici family. Initially, under Cosimo the Elder, Piero the Gouty, Lorenzo the Magnificent and Piero the Unfortunate, the forms of the republic were retained and the Medici ruled without a title, usually without even a formal office. These rulers presided over the Florentine Renaissance.

There was a return to the republic from 1494 to 1512, when first Girolamo Savonarola then Piero Soderini oversaw the state. Cardinal Giovanni de' Medici retook the city with Spanish forces in 1512, before going to Rome to become Pope Leo X. Florence was dominated by a series of papal proxies until 1527 when the citizens declared the republic again, only to have it taken from them again in 1530 after a siege by an Imperial and Spanish army. At this point Pope Clement VII and Charles V appointed Alessandro de' Medici as the first formally hereditary ruler.

The Sienese commune was not incorporated into Tuscany until 1555, and during the 15th century Siena enjoyed a cultural 'Sienese Renaissance' with its own more conservative character. Lucca remained an independent Republic until 1847 when it became part of Grand Duchy of Tuscany by the will of its people. Piombino was another minor state that was not part of the Grand Duchy, but under both Spanish and Tuscan influence.

== Grand Duchy of Tuscany ==
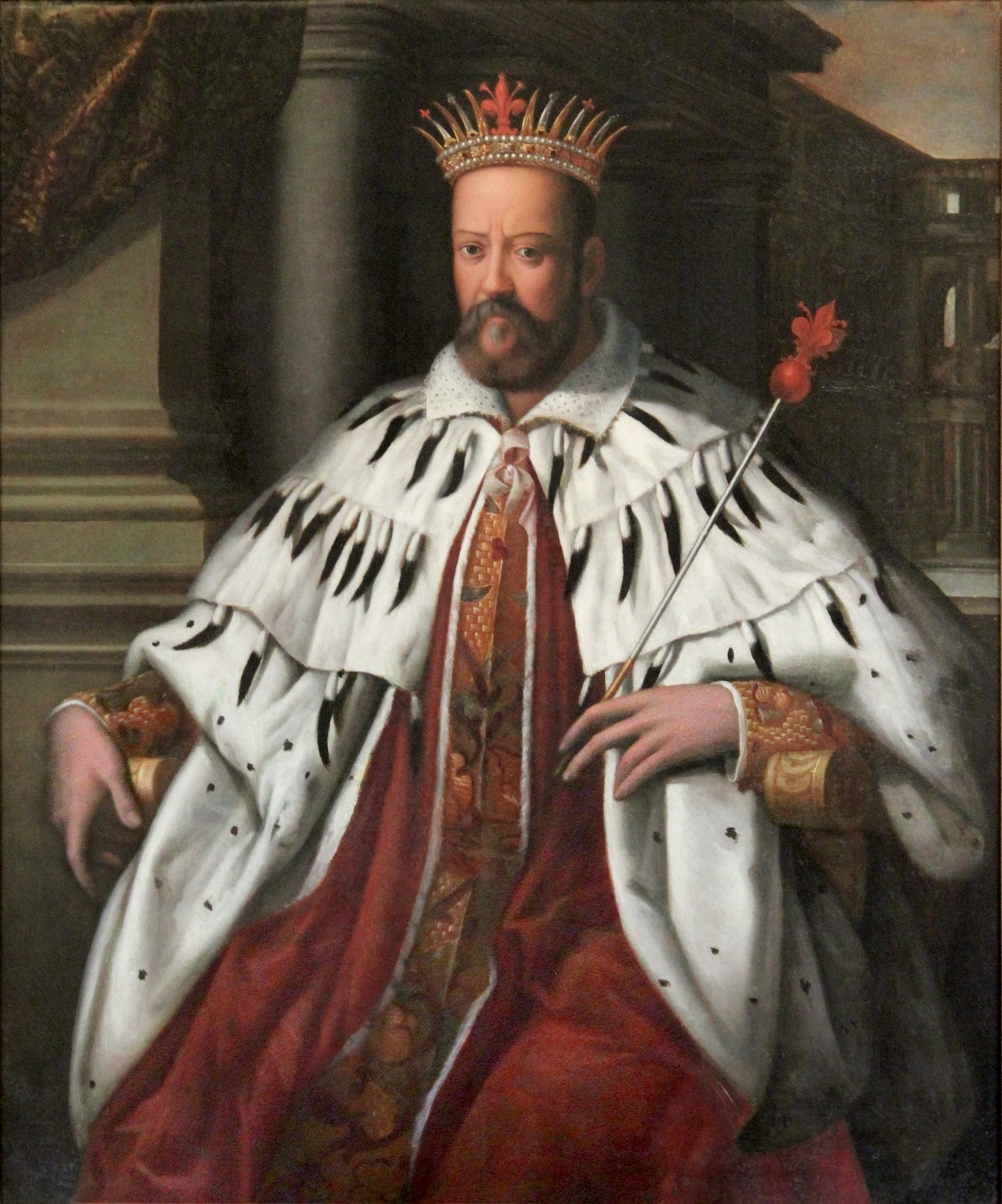
Cosimo I de' Medici, the first Grand Duke of Tuscany.

For most of the 16th century the Medici ruled Florence and Tuscany quite successfully, expanding the state's territory greatly by acquiring Siena. The Medici were patrons of science and the arts which flowered for much of their reign. Tuscany became a more cohesive and unified state during these years, rather than simply the dominion of a dominating city, Florence.

As time went on, Tuscany was transformed in a number of ways, not always positively. Most importantly, the economy underwent a fundamental change in character. The wool industry was decimated during these later years, though the silk industry was, to some extent, able to replace it. Nonetheless, industry, which had shaped and sustained Florence since the Middle Ages, began to decline throughout the 17th century. Investment in business became less lucrative and there was some "re-feudalization" of the Tuscan state with many patricians investing in land instead of industry. Tuscany is generally agreed to have declined greatly by the early 18th century under a series of inept grand dukes.

After the House of Medici died out, Francis I, a cognatic descendant of the dynasty, succeeded the family and ascended the throne of Grand Duchy, placing the state under the sovereignty of the House of Habsburg-Lorraine.

Known in Italy as Pietro Leopoldo, Leopold I was the only progressive reformer to rule Tuscany. He abolished the last vestiges of serfdom, encouraged trade and industry, and reformed the bureaucracy. During his long reign Tuscany became one of the most prosperous states in Italy. On 30 November 1786, he promulgated a penal reform, the Leopoldine Code, making Tuscany the first sovereign state to abolish the death penalty. In this time period Tuscany was also known as a "Guild".

Ferdinand III was deposed by Napoleon Bonaparte in 1801 so that Tuscany could be given to the Bourbon Dukes of Parma as compensation for the loss of their duchy. During this brief period, the Grand Duchy of Tuscany was known as the Kingdom of Etruria.

Tuscany/Etruria was annexed by Napoleonic France in 1807. In 1809 Napoleon gave his sister Elisa Bonaparte the honorary title of Grand Duchess of Tuscany. In 1814, after Napoleon's downfall, Ferdinand III was restored as grand duke. However, in 1815, the Congress of Vienna separated the Duchy of Lucca from Tuscany to give to the Bourbons of Parma in compensation for other losses. (Lucca would be reintegrated into Tuscany in 1847.)

== Kingdom of Italy ==
In 1861 Tuscany became part of modern Italy. Florence replaced Turin as Italy's capital in 1865, hosting the country's first parliament, and was superseded by Rome six years later, in 1871.

== See also ==
- Grand Duchy of Tuscany
- Grand Prince of Tuscany
- Grand Princesses of Tuscany
- History of Florence
- History of Siena
- House of Habsburg-Lorraine
- House of Medici
- Kingdom of Etruria
- List of Italian State Archives in Tuscany
- List of rulers of Tuscany
- Lucca
- Pisa

== Sources ==
- Barker, Graeme; Rasmussen, Tom (2000) [1998]. The Etruscans. Malden, Massachusetts: Blackwell. ISBN 0-631-22038-0.
- Jones, Emma (2005). Adventure Guide Tuscany & Umbria. Edison, New Jersey: Hunter. ISBN 1-58843-399-4.
