= List of grand dukes of Tuscany =

Grand Duke of Tuscany
- Left: Coat of arms under Medici period Right: Coat of arms under Habsburg-Lorraine period

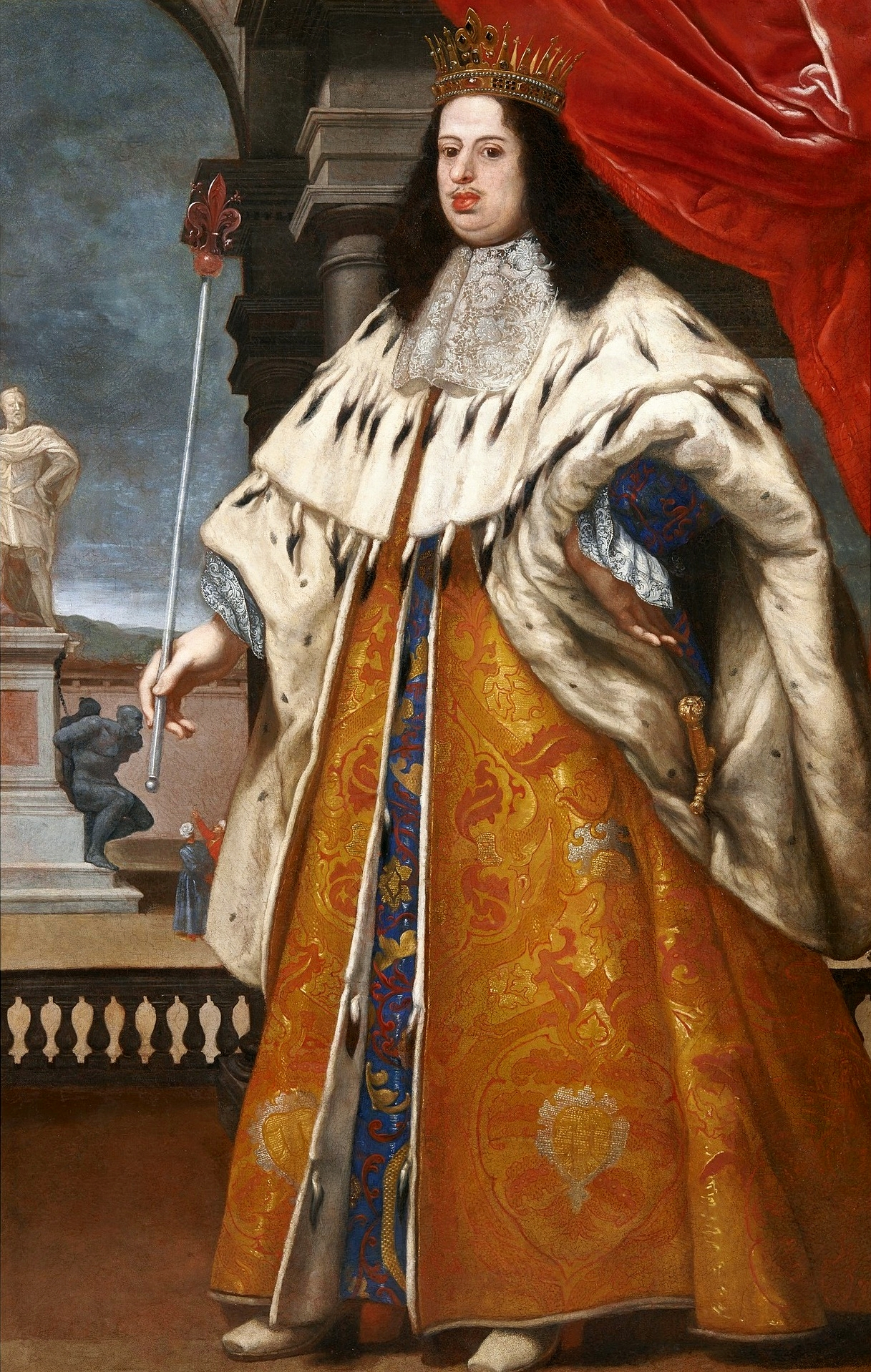
- Longest reigning Cosimo III de' Medici; 23 May 1670 – 31 October 1723

Details
- First monarch: Cosimo I de' Medici
- Last monarch: Leopold II (de jure); Ferdinand IV (de facto/titular)
- Formed: 27 August 1569
- Abolished: 16 August 1859
- Residence: Palazzo Pitti

This is a list of grand dukes of Tuscany. The title was created on 27 August 1569 by a papal bull of Pope Pius V to Cosimo I de' Medici, member of the illustrious House of Medici. His coronation took place in Rome on 5 March 1570 by the hands of the Pope himself.

Cosimo's family, the Medici dynasty, had been ruling the Florentine Republic, the predecessor of the Grand Duchy of Tuscany, since 1434, first as Lords of Florence and later as Dukes. The title of Grand Duke, was in fact the second title of recognition within the Tuscan politics given by a Pope to the Medici family, the first being that of Duke of the Florentine Republic, created by Pope Clement VII in 1532.

The official residence of the Grand Dukes was the Palazzo Pitti in Florence, bought by the Medici in 1549.

== Background ==
Margraves reigned in the 9th century when the region was part of the Margraviate of Tuscany. Beginning in the 11th century, the region was fully divided into several independent cities, which included Pisa, Florence, Siena, Lucca, Arezzo among others. However, with the territorial expansion of Florence, Tuscany began to "come together" again under one single leadership. This situation became even clearer with the creation of the Grand Duchy of Tuscany in 1569. Over the years, the Grand duchy managed to absorb practically the entire region of present-day Tuscany, until its own final annexation to the Kingdom of Italy.

== Medici grand dukes of Tuscany, 1569–1737 ==
The Grand Duchy of Tuscany was the first period after centuries of political divisions, when most of the region was under the rule of a single leader. The Grand Duchy's territory comprised almost the entire region of present-day Tuscany, with the exception of the Republic of Lucca, the Principality of Piombino, the Duchy of Massa and Carrara and the State of the Presidi.

Portrait	Name	Lifespan	Reign	Consorts	House	Succession
	Cosimo I de' Medici	12 June 1519 – 21 April 1574	21 August 1569 – 21 April 1574	(1) Eleanor of Toledo; 29 June 1539; Florence; 11 children (2) Camilla Martelli; 1570; 1 daughter	Medici	Son of Giovanni dalle Bande Nere, later became the first Grand Duke of Tuscany.
	Francesco I de' Medici	25 March 1541 – 19 October 1587	21 April 1574 – 17 October 1587	(1) Joanna of Austria; 18 December 1565; Florence; 8 children (2) Bianca Cappello; 10 June 1579; 1 son	Medici	Son of Cosimo I
	Ferdinando I de' Medici	30 July 1549 – 3 February 1609	19 October 1587 – 7 February 1609	Christina of Lorraine; 1589; Florence; 9 children	Medici	Son of Cosimo I
	Cosimo II de' Medici	12 May 1590 – 28 February 1621	17 February 1609 – 28 February 1621	Maria Maddalena of Austria; 1608; 8 children	Medici	Son of Ferdinando I
	Ferdinando II de' Medici	14 July 1610 – 23 May 1670	28 February 1621 – 23 May 1670	Vittoria della Rovere; 6 April 1637; 4 children	Medici	Son of Cosimo II
	Cosimo III de' Medici	14 August 1642 – 31 October 1723	23 May 1670 – 31 October 1723	Marguerite Louise d'Orléans; 17 April 1661; Louvre; 3 children	Medici	Son of Ferdinando II
	Gian Gastone de' Medici	24 May 1671 – 9 July 1737	31 October 1723 – 9 July 1737	Anna Maria Franziska of Saxe-Lauenburg; 2 July 1697; Düsseldorf no issue	Medici	Son of Cosimo III

== Habsburg-Lorraine grand dukes of Tuscany, 1737–1801 ==
Portrait	Name	Lifespan	Reign	Consorts	House	Succession
	Francesco II Stefano	8 December 1708 – 18 August 1765	12 July 1737 – 18 August 1765	Maria Theresa; 12 February 1736; Vienna; 16 children	Lorraine	Great-great-great-grandson of Francesco I, received Tuscany per the terms of the Treaty of Vienna
	Leopoldo I	5 May 1747 – 1 March 1792	18 August 1765 – 22 July 1790	Maria Luisa of Spain; 16 February 1764; Madrid; 16 children	Habsburg-Lorraine	Second son of Francesco II Stefano
	Ferdinando III	6 May 1769 – 18 June 1824	22 July 1790 – 3 August 1801	(1) Luisa of Naples and Sicily; 19 September 1790; Vienna; 6 children (2) Maria Ferdinanda of Saxony; 6 May 1821; Florence no issue	Habsburg-Lorraine	Second son of Leopoldo I

== Bourbon-Parma kings of Etruria, 1801–1807 ==
Period that the Bourbon-Parma were placed as "Kings" by Napoleon in the Kingdom of Etruria. The Kingdom was a creation of Napoleon to replace the Grand Duchy of Tuscany, comprising a large part of modern Tuscany.

Portrait	Name	Lifespan	Reign	Consorts	House	Succession
	Ludovico I	5 July 1773 – 27 May 1803	21 March 1801 – 27 May 1803	Maria Luisa of Spain; 25 August 1795; Madrid; 2 children	Bourbon-Parma	Grandson of Francesco II Stefano
	Ludovico II	22 December 1799 – 16 April 1883	27 May 1803 – 10 December 1807	Unmarried while King; later married Maria Teresa of Savoy	Bourbon-Parma	Son of Ludovico I

== Bonaparte grand ducal ruler of Tuscany, 1809–1814 ==
Tuscany was annexed by France in 1807. Napoleon's sister, Elisa Bonaparte, was given the title "Grand Duchess of Tuscany" in 1809, a title de jure sovereign but de facto honorary.

Portrait	Name	Lifespan	Reign	Consorts	House	Succession
	Elisa	3 January 1777 – 7 August 1820	3 March 1809 – 1 February 1814	Felice Pasquale Baciocchi; 1 May 1797; Marseille; 5 children	Bonaparte	Puppet ruler of Napoleon I

== Habsburg-Lorraine grand dukes of Tuscany, 1814–1860 ==
Portrait	Name	Lifespan	Reign	Consorts	House	Succession
	Ferdinando III	6 May 1769 – 18 June 1824	27 April 1814 – 18 June 1824	(1) Luisa of Naples and Sicily; 19 September 1790; Vienna; 6 children (2) Maria Ferdinanda of Saxony; 6 May 1821; Florence no issue	Habsburg-Lorraine	Restored
	Leopoldo II	3 October 1797 – 29 January 1870	18 June 1824 – 21 July 1859	(1) Maria Anna of Saxony; 28 October 1817; Dresden; 4 children (2) Maria Antonia of the Two Sicilies; 7 June 1833; Naples; 10 children	Habsburg-Lorraine	Son of Ferdinando III
	Ferdinando IV	10 June 1835 – 17 January 1908	21 July 1859 – 22 March 1860	(1) Anna of Saxony; 24 November 1856; Dresden; 2 daughters (2) Alice of Parma; 11 January 1868; Frohsdorf; 10 children	Habsburg-Lorraine	Son of Leopoldo II

Leopoldo II was driven from Tuscany by revolution from 21 February to 12 April 1849, and again on 27 April 1859. He abdicated in favor of his son, Ferdinando IV, on 21 July 1859, but Ferdinando IV was never recognized in Tuscany, and was deposed by the provisional government on 16 August. Tuscany was annexed by Piedmont-Sardinia on 22 March 1860.

== Titular Habsburg-Lorraine claimants, 1860–present ==
Portrait	Name	Lifespan	Reign	Consorts	Succession
	Ferdinando IV	10 June 1835 – 17 January 1908	22 March 1860 – 17 January 1908	(1) Anna of Saxony; 24 November 1856; Dresden; 2 daughters (2) Alice of Parma; 11 January 1868; Frohsdorf; 10 children	Son of Leopoldo II
	Giuseppe Ferdinando	24 May 1872 – 28 August 1942	17 January 1908 – 2 May 1921	(1) Rosa Kaltenbrunner; 2 May 1921; Maria Plain no issue (2) Gertrude Tomanek von Beyerfels-Mondsee; 27 January 1929; Vienna; 2 children	Second son of Ferdinando IV
	Pietro Ferdinando	2 May 1874 – 8 November 1948	2 May 1921 – 8 November 1948	Maria Cristina of Bourbon-Two Sicilies; 8 November 1900; Cannes; 4 children	Third son of Ferdinando IV
	Goffredo	14 March 1902 – 21 January 1984	8 November 1948 - 21 January 1984	Dorothea of Bavaria; 2 August 1938; Sárvár; 4 children	Son of Pietro Ferdinando
	Leopoldo Francesco	25 October 1942 - 23 June 2021	21 January 1984 - 18 June 1993	Laetitia d'Arenberg; 19 June 1965; St. Gilgen; 2 sons	Son of Goffredo
	Sigismondo	21 April 1966 – Present	18 June 1993 – Present	Elyssa Juliet Edmonstone; 1999; 3 children	Son of Leopoldo Francesco

== See also ==
- March of Tuscany § Margraves of Tuscany, 812–1197
- History of Tuscany § Republican governments, c. 1000–1805
- List of heads of state of Florence (1434 to 1569)
- List of Tuscan consorts
- House of Habsburg § House of Habsburg-Tuscany
- History of Tuscany
