= Departments of the First French Empire =

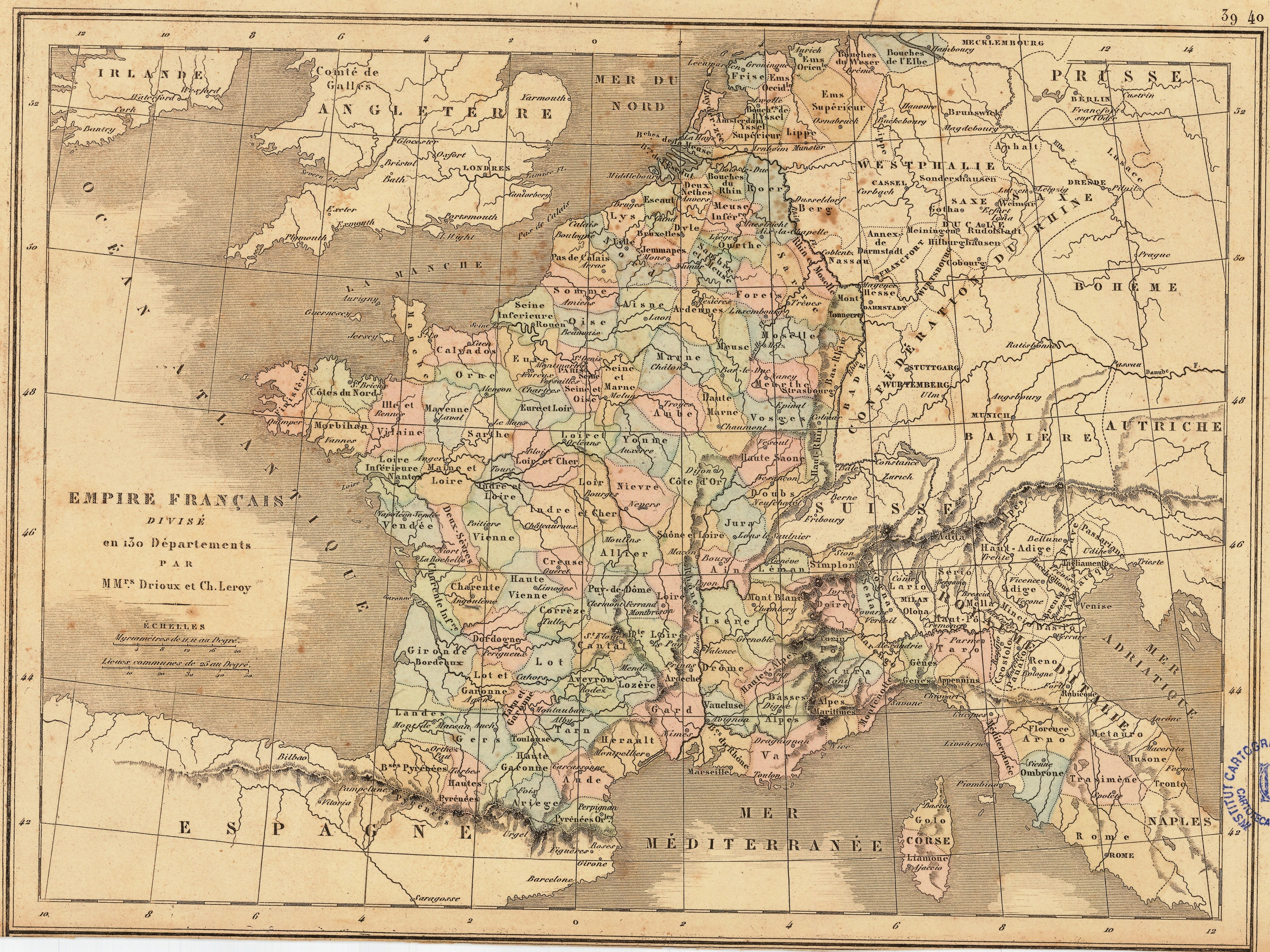
Map of the First French Empire in 1811: Empire français divisé en 130 départements by MM. Drioux and Leroy

Map of the First French Empire in 1812, including the seven intendancies of the Illyrian Provinces as well as the four Spanish departments whose juridical status was incomplete

This is a list of the 130 departments (French: départements), the name for the administrative subdivisions of the First French Empire at the height of its territorial extent, circa 1811.

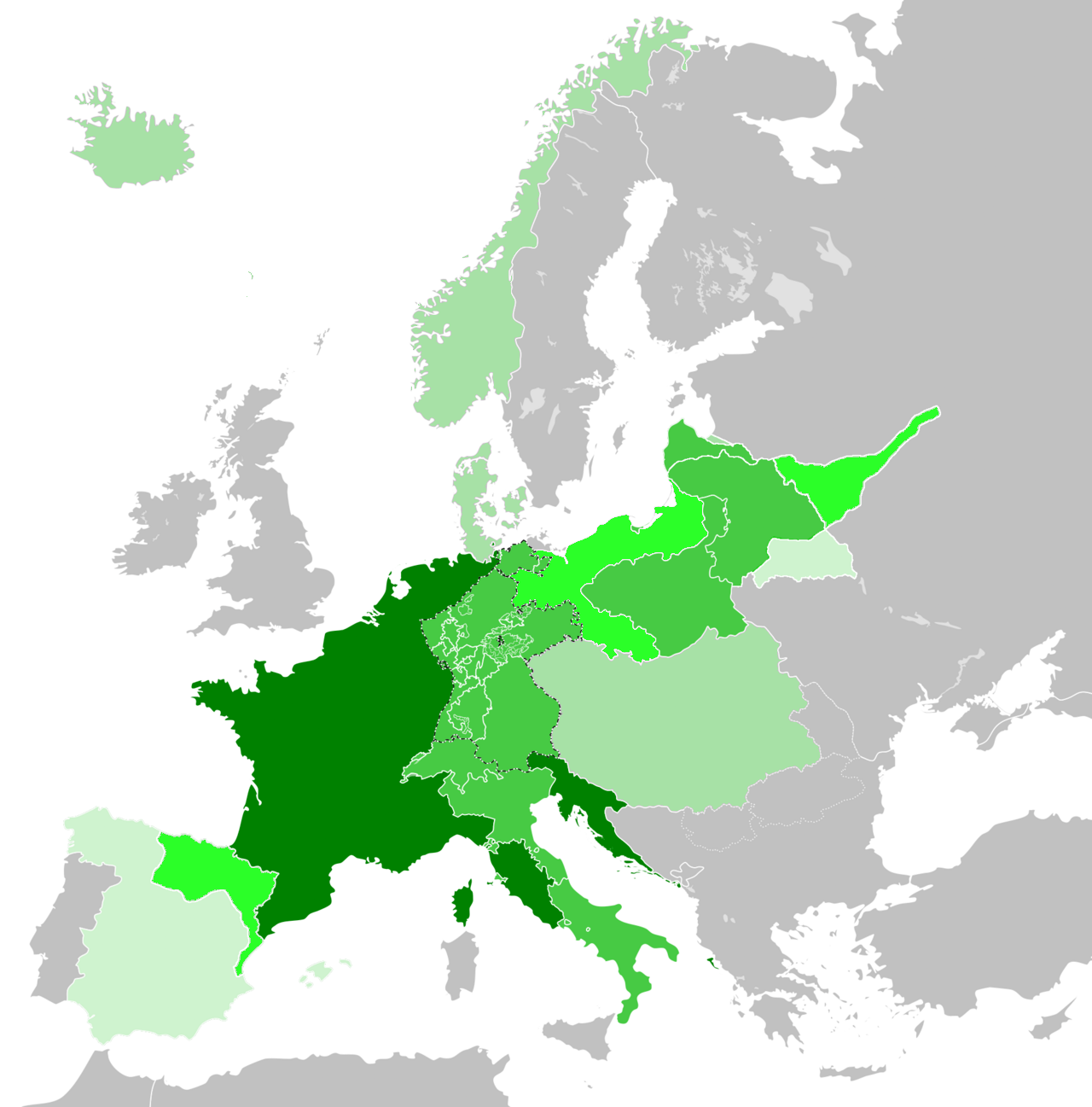
The First French Empire at its peak territorial control in September 1812

Several territories of European France were also ruled over directly by France but were not organised into departments, these being: Illyrian Provinces, and the Principality of Erfurt, and so these are not included in this list. Similarly, four additional French departments were also created in Catalonia (annexed from Spain in 1812); their juridical status remained incomplete until the French lost their grip on Spain in 1814. Those departments were: Bouches-de-l'Èbre, Montserrat, Sègre, and Ter.

== List ==
Ain	Cher	Haut-Rhin	Maine-et-Loire	Roer
Aisne	Corrèze	Haute-Garonne	Manche	Rome
Allier	Corse	Haute-Loire	Marengo	Sambre-et-Meuse
Alpes-Maritimes	Côte-d'Or	Haute-Marne	Marne	Saône-et-Loire
Apennins	Côtes-du-Nord	Haute-Saône	Mayenne	Sarre
Ardèche	Creuse	Haute-Vienne	Méditerranée	Sarthe
Ardennes	Deux-Nèthes	Hautes-Alpes	Meurthe	Seine
Ariège	Deux-Sèvres	Hautes-Pyrénées	Meuse	Seine-et-Marne
Arno	Doire	Hérault	Meuse-Inférieure	Seine-et-Oise
Aube	Dordogne	Ille-et-Vilaine	Mont-Blanc	Seine-Inférieure
Aude	Doubs	Indre	Mont-Tonnerre	Sésia
Aveyron	Drôme	Indre-et-Loire	Montenotte	Simplon
Bas-Rhin	Dyle	Isère	Morbihan	Somme
Basses-Alpes	Ems-Occidental	Jemmape(s)	Moselle	Stura
Basses-Pyrénées	Ems-Oriental	Jura	Nièvre	Tarn
Bouches-de-l'Elbe	Ems-Supérieur	Landes	Nord	Tarn-et-Garonne
Bouches-de-l'Escaut	Escaut	Léman	Oise	Taro
Bouches-de-l'Yssel	Eure	Lippe	Ombrone	Trasimène
Bouches-de-la-Meuse	Eure-et-Loir	Loir-et-Cher	Orne	Var
Bouches-du-Rhin	Finistère	Loire	Ourthe	Vaucluse
Bouches-du-Rhône	Forêts	Loire-Inférieure	Pas-de-Calais	Vendée
Bouches-du-Weser	Frise	Loiret	Pô	Vienne
Calvados	Gard	Lot	Puy-de-Dôme	Vosges
Cantal	Gênes	Lot-et-Garonne	Pyrénées-Orientales	Yonne
Charente	Gers	Lozère	Rhin-et-Moselle	Yssel-Supérieur
Charente-Inférieure	Gironde	Lys	Rhône	Zuyderzée

The names of departments formed from territories annexed to France after 1791 have been colour-coded as follows:

Former territory of the Kingdom of Sardinia, annexed in 1792 (Duchy of Savoy) and 1793 (County of Nice)
Former territory of the Austrian Netherlands and other territories (Liège, Stavelot-Malmedy and Thorn), annexed in 1795
Former territory of the Holy Roman Empire on the left bank of the Rhine, annexed on various dates between 1795 and 1801
Former territory of the Cisrhenian Republic, annexed in 1802
Former territory of the Subalpine Republic (annexed in 1802) and the Ligurian Republic (annexed in 1805)
Former territory of the Kingdom of Etruria (annexed in 1807) and the Duchy of Parma (annexed in 1808)
Former territory of the Papal States, annexed in 1809
Former territory of various German states, annexed in 1810
Former territory of the Kingdom of Holland, annexed in 1810
Former territory of the Rhodanic Republic, annexed in 1810

Moreover, the Tanaro department was established in 1802 and disbanded in 1805; it was one of the six original départments which took the place of the Subalpine Republic. Its territory was divided between the three départments of Marengo, Stura, and Montenotte (the latter was created after the annexation of the Ligurian Republic).
