= French departments of Catalonia =

The French departments of Catalonia were territorial subdivisions of the territory conquered in Catalonia (until then part of Spain) in 1812 by the First French Empire at the outset of the Peninsular War. Their annexation by France was never officially validated even by France itself and they were officially suppressed on 10 March 1814 before being returned to Spain.

== Departments of 1812 ==
The territory annexed by the Empire by a decree of 26 January 1812 was divided by the same decree into four departments:

- Bouches-de-l'Èbre (prefecture: Lleida)
- Montserrat (prefecture: Barcelona)
- Sègre (prefecture: Puigcerdà). It included Andorra, which had earlier been established as a co-principate by Napoleon
- Ter (prefecture: Girona)
- The Valley of Aran was included into the Haute-Garonne department.

The decree was never published in the Bulletin des Lois de l'Empire français, but is quoted in the decree of 15 January 1813 that organizes the Valley of Aran communes. In the museum at Figueres in the province of Girona is a reproduction of the Le Moniteur which created these four departments.

== Departments of 1813 ==
On 7 March 1813 the above four departments were merged into two:

- Bouches-de-l'Èbre-Montserrat, by merging des Bouches-de-l'Èbre and Montserrat (prefecture : Barcelona)
- Sègre-Ter, by merging Sègre and Ter (prefecture : Girona)

== See also ==
- List of French possessions and colonies
