= Pô (department) =

Former French department in Italy (1802–1814)

Département du Pô
- department of the French First Republic and of the First French Empire
- 1802–1814
- Location of Pô in France (1812)
- Capital: Turin
- Area
  - Coordinates: 45°04′N 07°42′E
  - 1812: 4,145.26 km^{2} (1,600.49 sq mi)
- Population
  - 1812: 399,237
- History
  - Decree of 24 Fructidor, year X: 11 September 1802
  - Treaty of Fontainebleau: 11 April 1814
- Political subdivisions: 3 arrondissements
Preceded by	Succeeded by
Eridan (department)	Turin (division)

Pô (French: [po]) was a department of the French First Republic and of the First French Empire in present-day Italy. It was named after the river Po. It was formed in 1802, when the Subalpine Republic (formerly the mainland portion of the Kingdom of Sardinia) was directly annexed to France. A provisional department called Eridan was planned in 1799 and established in 1801 in the French-occupied Piedmont. After the annexation, Eridan was divided between Pô and Doire. Its capital was Turin.

The department was disbanded after the defeat of Napoleon in 1814. At the Congress of Vienna, the Savoyard King of Sardinia was restored in all his previous realms and domains, including Piedmont. Its territory is now part of the Italian province of Turin.

== Subdivisions ==
Coat of arms of the city of Turin under the French Empire

The department was subdivided into the following arrondissements and cantons (situation in 1812):

- Turin, cantons: Carignano, Carmagnola, Casalborgone, Ceres, Cirié, Corio, Caselle, Gassino, Lanzo, Moncalieri, Orbassano, Poirino, Chieri (French: Quiers), Riva presso Chieri, Rivoli, Turin (6 cantons), Venaria and Viù.
- Pinerolo, cantons: Bricherasio, Cavour, Cumiana, Fenestrelle, None, Perosa, Pinerolo, Torre Pellice, Val Balsiglia, Vigone and Villafranca.
- Susa, cantons: Avigliana, Bardonecchia, Bussoleno, Cesana, Giaveno, Oulx, Susa and Villar Almese.

Its population in 1812 was 399,237, and its area was 414,526 hectares.

== Governing Prefects ==
- 26 August 1802–1805—Victor Hercule Joseph Ferdinand comte de Lavilla de Villasteloni
- 1805–1808—Pierre Loysel
- 1808–1809—Étienne Vincent Marnolia
- 19 February 1809–1813—Alexandre Théodore Victor de Lameth baron de Lameth
