= Tanaro (department) =

Former French department in Italy (1802–1805)

Département du Tanaro
- department of the French First Republic
- 1801–1805
- Capital: Asti
- Area
  - Coordinates: 44°54′N 8°12′E
- Population
  - 1805: 310,459
- History
  - Decree of 24 Fructidor, year X: 11 September 1801
  - Disbanded: 6 June 1805
- Political subdivisions: 3 arrondissements
Preceded by	Succeeded by
Subalpine Republic	Marengo (department)

Tanaro (French: [ta.na.ʁo]) was a short-lived department of the French First Republic and of the First French Empire in present-day Italy. It was named after the river Tanaro. It was formed in 1801, when the Subalpine Republic (formerly the mainland portion of the Kingdom of Sardinia) was intended to be annexed to France. Its capital was Asti, though Alessandria was the original intended capital.

The department was disbanded in 1805, when the French conquered the Ligurian Republic, and its territory was divided over the departments of Marengo, Montenotte and Stura.

== Subdivision ==
The department was subdivided into the following arrondissements and cantons (situation in 1805):

- Asti, cantons: Asti, Canelli, Castelnuovo, Cocconato, Costigliole, Mombercelli, Montafia, Montechiaro, Portacomaro, Rocca d'Arazzo, San Damiano, Tigliole and Villanova d'Asti.
- Acqui, cantons: Acqui, Castelletto d'Orba, Dego, Incisa, Nizza Monferrato, Santo Stefano Belbo, Spigno and Visone.
- Alba, cantons: Alba, Bossolasco, Bra, Canale, Cortemilia, Guarene, La Morra and Sommariva del Bosco.

Its population in 1805 was 310,459.
