= Bouches-de-l'Èbre =

Former French department (1812–1813)

Location of Bouches-de-l'Èbre in France (1812)

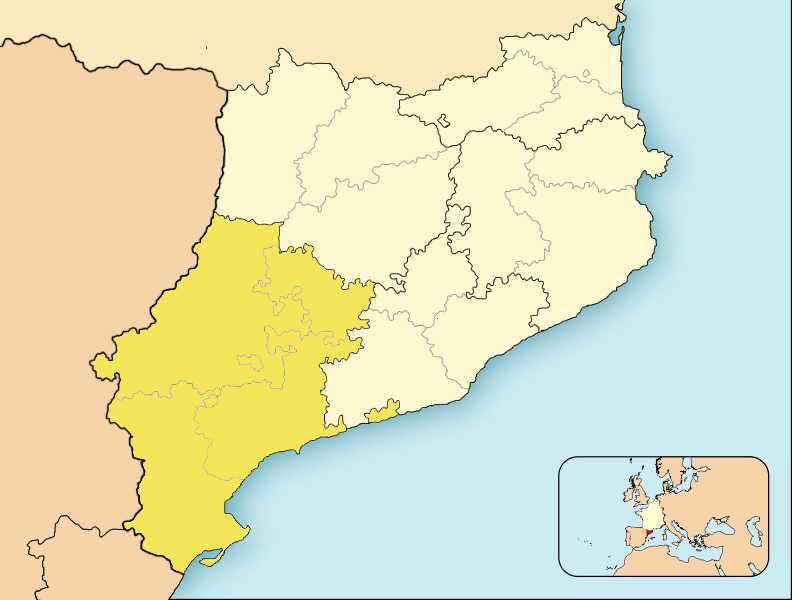
The department within a map of Catalonia

Bouches-de-l'Èbre (French: [buʃ.də.lɛbʁ]; "Mouths of the Ebro") Catalan: Boques de l'Ebre), was a short-lived department of the First French Empire in present-day Spain. It was created on 26 January 1812 on Catalonia's annexation by the French Empire. It incorporated Catalan territories of the Ebre basin and the municipalities of Fraga and Mequinenza. Its prefecture was in Lleida and its subprefectures were Tortosa, Cervera and Tarragona; its only prefect was Alban de Villeneuve-Bargemont, who had previously been auditor to the Council of State and sub prefect of Zierickzée (a subprefecture of the department of Bouches-de-l'Escaut). He served as prefect from 12 February 1812 until 1813, moving to become prefect of Sambre-et-Meuse then of Tarn-et-Garonne under the First Restoration - he then continued his career as a prefect under the Second Restoration before finally becoming a member of the Chamber of Deputies of France under the July Monarchy.

On 7 March 1813 this department was merged with that of Montserrat to form the department of Montserrat-et-Bouches-de-l'Èbre (though the civil administration of the area was suppressed and replaced by a military government). After the French retreat, it was dissolved by Spain in 1814.

== See also ==
- French departments of Spain
- 130 departments of the First French Empire
