= Sésia =

Former French department in Italy (1802–1814)

Département de la Sésia
- Department of the First French Republic and of the First French Empire
- 1802–1814
- Location of Sésia in France (1812)
- Capital: Vercelli
- Area
  - Coordinates: 45°19′N 8°25′E
  - 1812: 3,351.18 km^{2} (1,293.90 sq mi)
- Population
  - 1812: 202,733
- History
  - Decree of 24 Fructidor, year X: 11 September 1802
  - Treaty of Fontainebleau: 11 April 1814
- Political subdivisions: 5 arrondissements
Preceded by	Succeeded by
Subalpine Republic	Division of Vercelli

Sésia (French: [sesja]) was a department of the First French Republic and of the First French Empire in present-day Italy. It was named after the river Sesia. It was formed in 1801, when the Subalpine Republic (formerly the mainland portion of the Kingdom of Sardinia) was intended to be annexed to France. Its capital was Vercelli.

The department was disbanded after the defeat of Napoleon in 1814. At the Congress of Vienna, the Savoyard King of Sardinia was restored in all his previous realms and domains, including Piedmont. Its territory is now divided between the Italian provinces of Vercelli and Biella.

== Subdivisions ==
Coat of arms of the city of Vercelli under the French Empire

The department was subdivided into the following arrondissements and cantons (situation in 1812):

- Vercelli, cantons: Agnona, Crevacuore, Gattinara, Masserano, Quinto, Stroppiana, Trino and Vercelli (2 cantons).
- Biella, cantons: Biella, Bioglio, Cacciorna, Candelo, Cavaglià, Cossato, Graglia, Mongrando and Mosso Santa Maria.
- Santhià, cantons: Buronzo, Cigliano, Crescentino, Livorno and Santhià.

Its population in 1812 was 202,733, and its area was 335,118 hectares.
