= Doire =

French administrative department

Department of Doire Département de la Doire (French) Djouire (Arpitan) Deura (Piedmontese)
- department of the French First Republic and of the First French Empire
- 1802–1814
- Location of Doire in France (1812)
- Capital: Ivrea
- Area
  - Coordinates: 45°28′N 07°53′E
  - 1812: 2,508.53 km^{2} (968.55 sq mi)
- Population
  - 1812: 238,000
- History
  - Decree of 24 Fructidor, year X: 11 September 1802
  - Treaty of Fontainebleau: 11 April 1814
- Political subdivisions: 3 arrondissements
Preceded by	Succeeded by
Eridan (department)	Aosta (division)

Doire (French pronunciation: [dwaʁ]) was a department of the French First Republic and of the First French Empire in present-day Italy. It was named after the river Dora Baltea (Doire Baltée). It was formed in 1802, when the Subalpine Republic (formerly the mainland portion of the Kingdom of Sardinia) was directly annexed to France. Its capital was Ivrea (Ivrée).

The department was disbanded after the defeat of Napoleon in 1814. At the Congress of Vienna, the Savoyard King of Sardinia was restored in all his previous realms and domains, including Piedmont. Its territory is now divided between the Italian province of Turin and the autonomous Aosta Valley region.

== Subdivisions ==
The department was subdivided into the following arrondissements and cantons (situation in 1812):

- Ivrea, cantons: Candia, Caravino, Castellamonte, Chiaverano, Cuorgnè, Ivrea, Locana, Pont Saint-Martin, Settimo Vittone, Strambino, Vico and Vistrorio.
- Aosta, cantons: Aosta, Châtillon, Donas, Fontainemore, Morgex, Valpelline, Verrès and Villeneuve.
- Chivasso, cantons: Caluso, Chivasso, Rivara, Rivarolo, San Benigno, San Giorgio.

Its population in 1812 was 238,000, and its area was 250,853 hectares.
