= Bouches-de-l'Èbre-Montserrat =

Former French department (1813–1814)

Bouches-de-l'Èbre-Montserrat (French: [buʃ.də.lɛbʁ.mɔ̃.sɛ.ʁa]; lit. 'Mouths of the Ebro–Montserrat') was a short-lived department of the First French Empire, created in present-day Spain on 7 March 1813 by merging the departments of Bouches-de-l'Èbre (the coastal region around Tarragona) and Montserrat (the Barcelona hinterland). This merger was established by decree but never published in the Bulletin des lois, leaving its judicial status uncertain. The department was officially suppressed on 10 March 1814.
