= Law of 14 Frimaire =

1793 French law centralizing power within the Committee of Public Safety

The Law of 14 Frimaire passed on 4 December 1793, during the French Revolution, in which power became centralized and consolidated under the Committee of Public Safety. It stopped représentants en mission from taking unaccountable, and sometimes despotic, 'action' without the authority of the committee. The Law of 14 Frimaire established the Bulletin des lois which existed until at least 1929 and possibly 1931 as the venue in which French laws were formally published. Counterfeiting the Bulletin des Lois was punishable by death.

Jacques-Nicolas Billaud-Varenne proposed the law as a means to rigorously centralize power in the National Convention and its Committee of Public Safety. This was an attempt to bring order to the Reign of Terror by making the representatives on-mission directly accountable to the Committee of Public Safety.

== See also ==
- Law of 22 Prairial, aka "the law of the Great Terror," enacted on 10 June 1794
