= Marengo (department) =

Former French department in Italy (1802–1814)

Département de Marengo
- department of the French First Republic and of the First French Empire
- 1801–1814
- Location of Marengo in France (1812)
- Capital: Alessandria
- Area
  - Coordinates: 44°55′N 08°37′E
  - 1812: 3,482.61 km^{2} (1,344.64 sq mi)
- Population
  - 1812: 318,447
- History
  - Decree of 24 Fructidor, year X: 11 September 1801
  - Treaty of Fontainebleau: 11 April 1814
- Political subdivisions: 3 arrondissements
Preceded by	Succeeded by
Tanaro (department)	Alessandria (division)

Marengo (French: [ma.ʁɛŋ.ɡo]) was a department of the French First Republic and of the First French Empire in present-day Italy. It was named after the Marengo plain near Alessandria to commemorate the eponymous French victory. It was formed in 1802, detaching part of the department of Tanaro, when the Subalpine Republic (formerly the mainland portion of the Kingdom of Sardinia) was directly annexed to France. Its capital was Alessandria, formerly the capital of Tanaro.

Initially it comprised the former Piedmontese provinces of Alessandria, Casale, Tortona, Voghera and Bobbio. Following the annexation of the Ligurian Republic to France in 1805, Voghera, Bobbio and Tortona passed to the newly created Department of Genoa, while the Department of Marengo acquired Asti, previously in the Department of Tanaro.

The department was disbanded after the defeat of Napoleon in 1814. At the Congress of Vienna, the Savoyard King of Sardinia was restored in all his previous realms and domains, including Piedmont. Its territory is now divided between the Italian provinces of Alessandria and Asti.

== Subdivisions ==
Coat of arms of the city of Alessandria under the French Empire

The department was subdivided into the following arrondissements and cantons (situation in 1812):

- Alessandria, cantons: Alessandria (2 cantons), Bosco, Cassine, Castellazzo, Felizzano, Sezzadio and Valenza.
- Asti, cantons: Asti, Canelli, Castelnuovo d'Asti, Cocconato, Costigliole, Mombercelli, Montafia, Montechiaro, Portacomaro, Rocca d'Arazzo, San Damiano, Tigliole and Villanova d'Asti.
- Casale, cantons: Casale, Gabiano, Moncalvo, Montemagno, Montiglio, Pontestura, Rosignano, San Salvatore, Ticineto and Villanova.

Its population in 1812 was 318,447, and its area was 348,261 hectares.

The division was included within the 28th military division, the 16th cohort of the légion d'honneur, the 29th conservation des forêts, the Diocese of Casale, the sénatorerie of Turin and the court of appeal of Genoa. It elected three deputies to the Corps législatif of the First Empire.
