= Sègre-Ter =

Former French department (1813–1814)

Sègre-Ter (French: [sɛɡʁ.tɛʁ]) was a department of France created in Spain on 7 March 1813 by merging the departments of Sègre and Ter. This merger was established by decree but never published in the Bulletin des lois, leaving its judicial status uncertain. The department was officially suppressed on 10 March 1814.
