= Subalpine Republic =

French republic (1800–1802)

Coordinates: 45°04′N 07°42′E

Subalpine Republic Repubblica Subalpina (Italian)
- 1800–1802
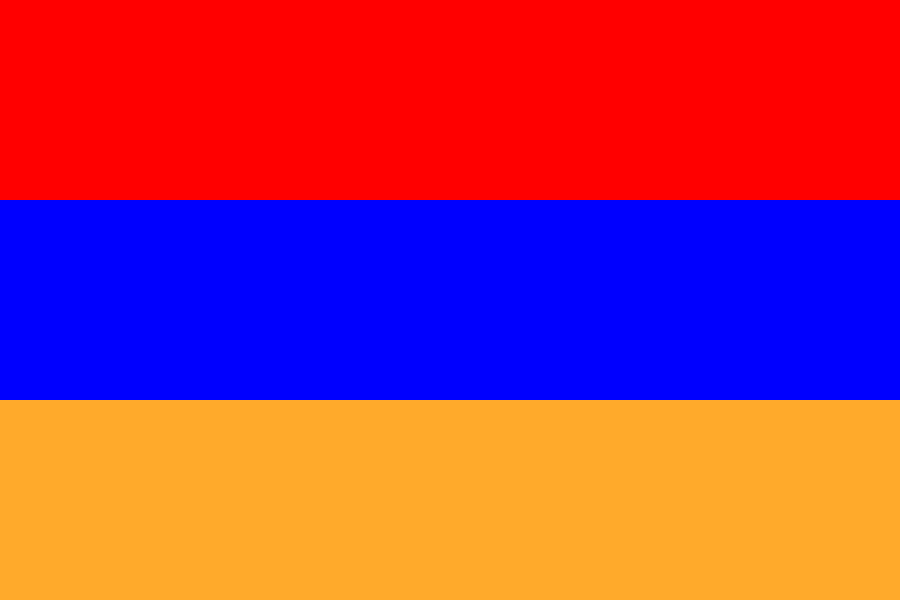
- Flag
- Motto: Liberté, Égalité; Liberty, Equality
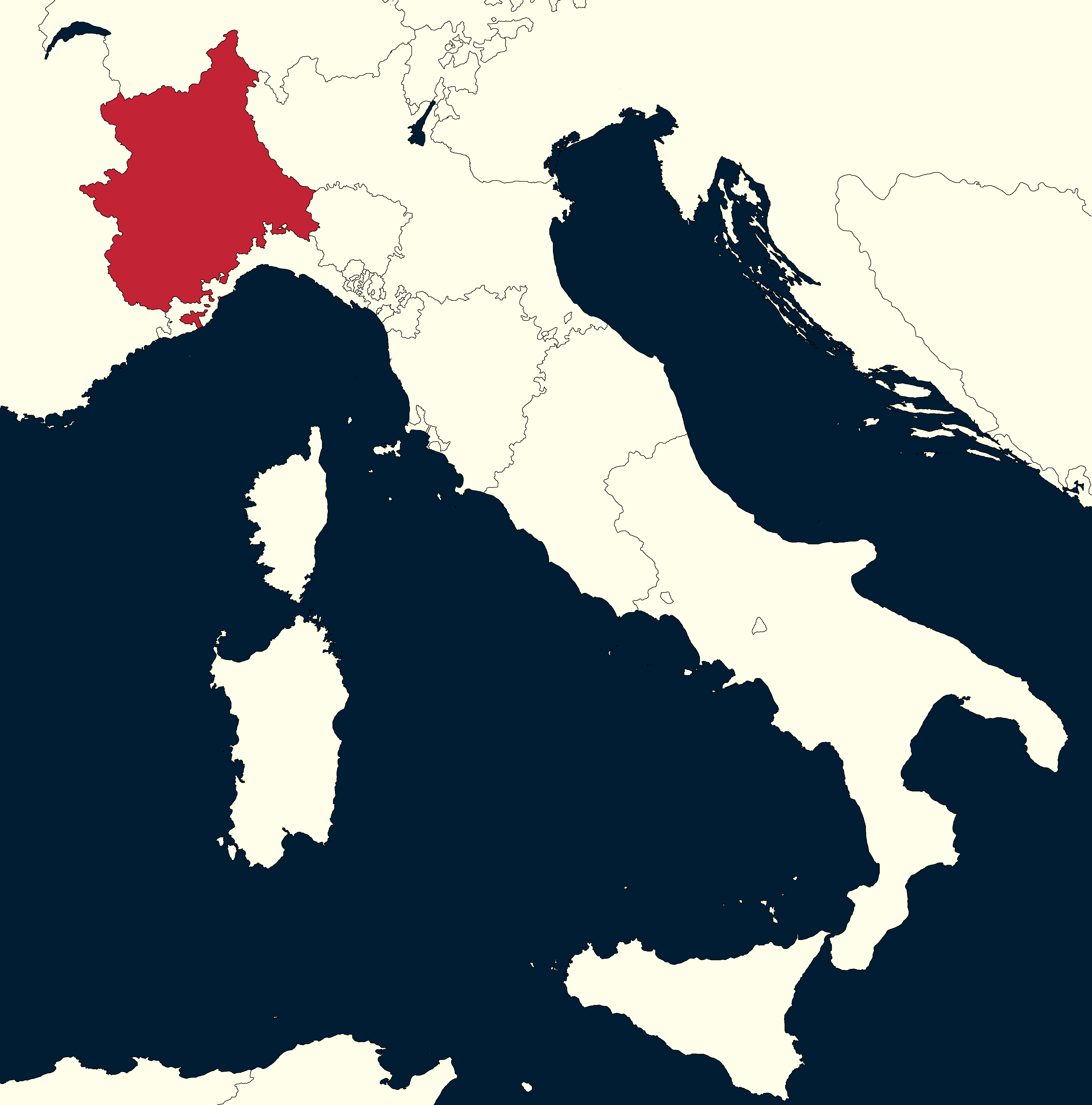
- The Subalpine Republic in 1801
- Status: Client state of France
- Capital: Turin
- Common languages: Italian, French
- Religion: Roman Catholicism; Waldensianism
- Government: Provisional Republic
- Provisional Executive
  - 1801–1802: Jean-Baptiste Jourdan
- Historical era: French Revolutionary Wars
  - Established: 20 June 1800
  - Disestablished: 11 September 1802
- Currency: French franc
| Preceded by | Succeeded by |
| Duchy of Savoy | French First Republic; Italian Republic |

The Subalpine Republic (Italian: Repubblica Subalpina) was a short-lived republic that existed between 1800 and 1802 on the territory of Piedmont during its military rule by the French Consulate.

== History ==
Piedmont was the main part of the Kingdom of Sardinia which, despite its name, had its core on the mainland. The kingdom suffered a first French invasion in 1796, which led to the Treaty of Paris and the loss of Savoy and Nice. After a second invasion in 1798, King Charles Emmanuel IV escaped to Rome, but he never agreed to sign a new peace treaty, approving a final arrangement of its continental territories according to international law.

The Piedmontese Republic was declared on 10 September 1798 and it existed until 20 June 1799, when it was conquered by Austro-Russian troops. However, Russian Marshall Alexander Suvorov was the sole political actor showing the will to restore the Kingdom of Sardinia's authority in Piedmont: as the old Republic’s fate was the annexation to France, the Austrian goal was the union of the region to the Holy Empire. More, this dispute was one of the main reasons of the political collapse of the Second Coalition.

In 1800, Napoleon returned to Italy, taking back much of the new republics. The Piedmontese Republic was re-established on 20 June 1800. To mark a difference with the Austrian occupation, the First Consul temporary suspended his annexation desires, and the local government took the name of Piedmontese Nation (Italian: Nazione Piemontese).

The republic had its capital at Turin. On 9 July 1800, it adopted a new flag, which consisted of a red-blue-gold triband (based on the flag of the earlier Republic of Alba). Its motto was Liberté, Égalité, which was taken from the French motto Liberté, égalité, fraternité.

The Subalpine Republic was heavily dependent on France and was never really independent as it was under French military occupation. The state was not recognized by the international community. Its government changed a number of times during its brief existence, and was made up of the following people:

| Government | Members |
|---|---|
| Commission of Government; 27 June – 24 December 1800 | Filippo Avogardo, conte di Quarenga e Cerreto |
| Commission of Government; 27 June – 24 December 1800 | Innocenzo Maurizio Baudisson |
| Commission of Government; 27 June – 24 December 1800 | Ugo Bottone, conte di Castellamonte |
| Commission of Government; 27 June – 24 December 1800 | Francesco Brayda |
| Commission of Government; 27 June – 24 December 1800 | Giuseppe Cavalli, conte di Olivola |
| Commission of Government; 27 June – 24 December 1800 | Pietro Gaetano Galli, conte della Loggia |
| Commission of Government; 27 June – 24 December 1800 | Stefano Giovanni Rocci |
Executive Commission; 24 December 1800 – 19 April 1801
| Executive Commission; 24 December 1800 – 19 April 1801 | Giuseppe Carlo Aurelio di Sant'Angelo |
| Executive Commission; 24 December 1800 – 19 April 1801 | Carlo Stefano Giulio |
| Executive Commission; 24 December 1800 – 19 April 1801 | Carlo Giuseppe Guglielmo Botta |
| Provisional Executive; 20 April 1801 – 11 September 1802 | Jean-Baptiste Jourdan |

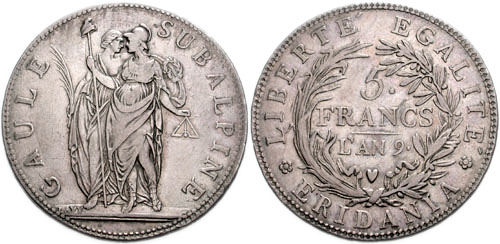
5 lire coin of the Subalpine Republic

Paris introduced French-style reforms within the Subalpine Republic. It used the French franc, and also minted its own coins.

In March 1801, when the Treaty of Lunéville ended the war with Austria, Paris resumed its annexation goals, the Piedmontese Army was incorporated into the French Army, and a few months later the administrative management of the region ended up completely in French hands as the Subalpine Gaul. Scholars in Paris underlined the resemblance of the Piedmontese language, at time the popular speaking while the Italian language was limited to the universities, with the French language. On 4 June 1802, Charles Emmanuel abdicated in favour of his brother Victor Emmanuel I, who was in Cagliari under British naval protection. Napoleon took this opportunity to declare the final forfeiture of the old sovereignty over Piedmont, and plans were made to annex it to France.

The Subalpine Republic ceased to exist on 11 September 1802, when it was divided between the French Republic and the Italian Republic. The French Republic annexed the départements of Doire, Marengo, Pô (briefly named "Éridan", after Eridanos), Sesia, Stura, and Tanaro, while the Italian Republic annexed Novara (as the department of Agogna).

== See also ==
- Republic of Alba
