= Donas =

Mountain in Poland

Coordinates: 54°28′10″N 18°26′14″E

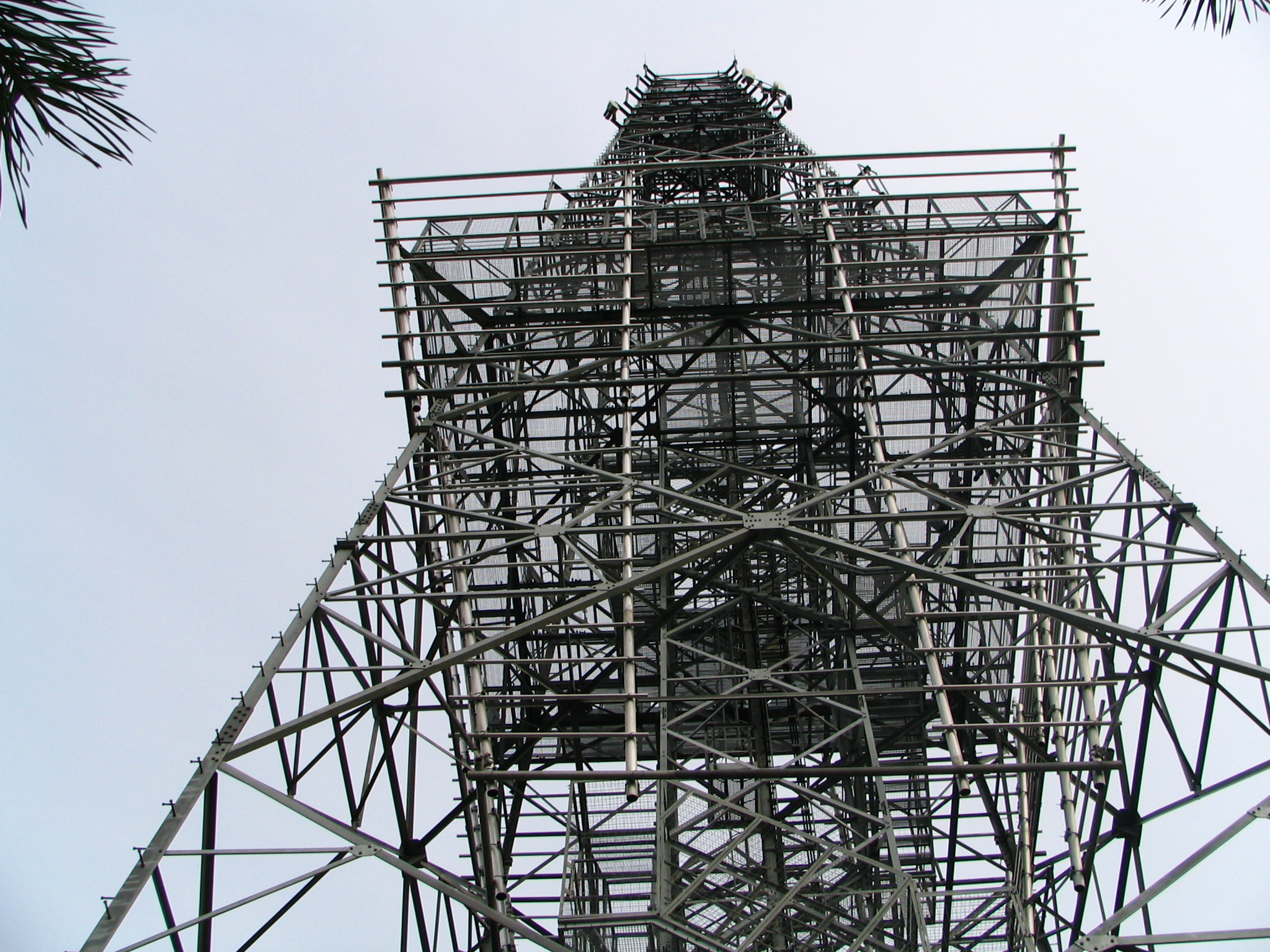
GSM tower on the top of Donas hill

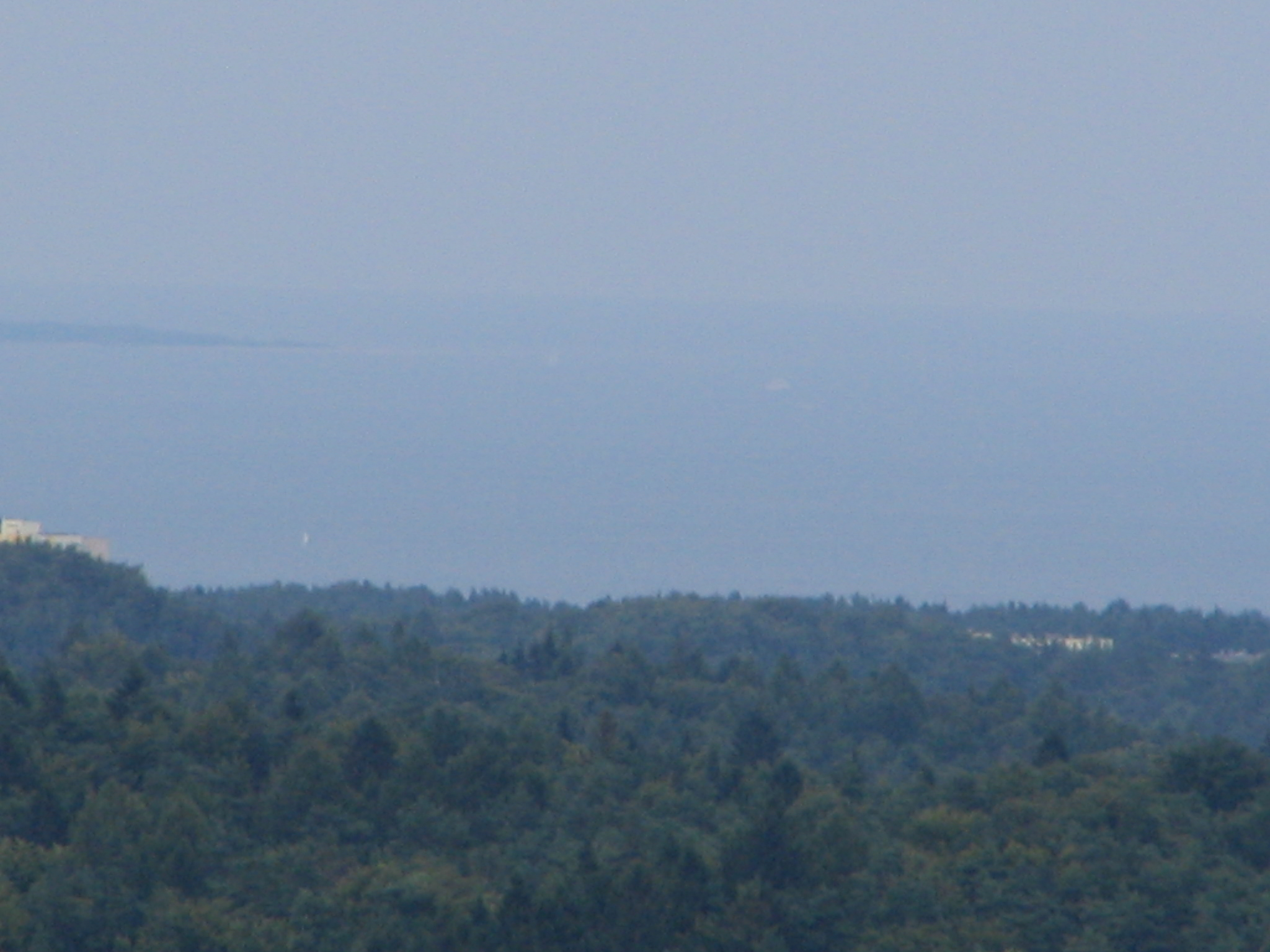
View from the top of the GSM tower, overlooking the Gdańsk Bay and Hel Peninsula.

The Donas hill is in Poland in the Pomerania region, within the borders of the City of Gdynia, in the Dąbrowa district. There are two summits, higher western 206.5 m, entirely forested, and the eastern one 205.6 m, the one with the GSM tower. In March 1945, a battle took place between the Red Army and the Germans. On the top, there is a GSM tower erected (Idea-Donas tower 2004), with a visitors terrace 232 m above sea level. The view includes Gdańsk, Gdynia, Gdańsk Bay, Hel Peninsula and Wieżyca mountain, the highest in the Pomerania region. Nearby is the old and abandoned cemetery that served the village of Kolonia Chwaszczyńska's population.

== See also ==
- Geography of Poland
