= Stura =

Former French department in Italy (1802–1814)

Département de la Stura
- Department of the French First Republic and of the First French Empire
- 1801–1814
- Location of Stura in France (1812)
- Capital: Cuneo
- Area
  - Coordinates: 44°23′N 7°32′E
  - 1812: 8,572.16 km^{2} (3,309.73 sq mi)
- Population
  - 1812: 431,438
- History
  - Decree of 24 Fructidor, year X: 11 September 1801
  - Treaty of Fontainebleau: 11 April 1814
- Political subdivisions: 5 Arrondissements
| Preceded by | Succeeded by |
| Subalpine Republic | Division of Cuneo |

Stura (French: [sty.ʁa]) was a department of the French First Republic and of the First French Empire in present-day Italy. It was named after the river Stura di Demonte. It was formed in 1801, when the Subalpine Republic (formerly the mainland portion of the Kingdom of Sardinia) was planned to be annexed to France. Its capital was Cuneo.

The department was disbanded after the defeat of Napoleon in 1814. At the Congress of Vienna, the Savoyard King of Sardinia was restored in all its previous realms and domains, including Piedmont. Its territory corresponded more or less with that of the present-day Italian province of Cuneo.

== Subdivisions ==
The department was subdivided into the following arrondissements and cantons (situation in 1812):

- Cuneo (French: Coni), cantons: Borgo San Dalmazzo, Boves, Busca, Caraglio, Centallo, Cuneo, Demonte, Dronero, San Damiano, Valgrana, Vernante and Vinadio.
- Alba, cantons: Alba, Bossolasco, Bra, Canale, Cortemilia, Guarene, La Morra and Sommariva del Bosco.
- Mondovì, cantons: Bene, Carrù, Chiusa, Mondovì (2 cantons), Rocca de' Baldi, Torre and Villanova.
- Saluzzo (French: Saluces), cantons: Barge, Moretta, Paesana, Revello, Sampeyre, Saluzzo, Venasca and Verzuolo.
- Savigliano, cantons: Cavallermaggiore, Cherasco, Costigliole, Fossano, Racconigi and Savigliano.

Its population in 1812 was 431,438, and its area was approximately 857,216 hectares.

The Geographical Dictionary portable 1809 summarized the Department of Stura:

"Climate rough, hilly ground, stony, produces abundant fruit, nuts, mulberry, chestnut woods, pastures, some cattle, many horses, mules excellent, mines gold and silver, marble quarries, gold flakes in the rivers, mineral waters. Its inhabitants are simple, aggressive, small, agile, excellent foot: soft and laboring women. Great trade for Lyon silk, fruit, truffles, fodder, livestock, dairy, marble, limestone, few factories and mills."

== List of prefects ==
- 26 August 1802 – 1803 Jean Laurent de Grégory, comte de Marcorengo
- 24 September 1803 – 1810 Pierre Amédée Vincent Joseph Marie Arborio-Biamino
- 30 November 1811 – 12 March 1813 Auguste Joseph Baude de La Vieuville
- 12 March 1813 – March 1813 Antoine Louis Campan
- 25 March 1813 – 1814 Louis-Honoré-Félix Le Peletier d'Aunay

== See also ==
- The river Stura di Demonte, tributary of the Tanaro.
- The rivers Stura di Lanzo and Stura del Monferrato, both tributaries of the Po.
