= Sègre (department) =

Former French department (1812–1813)

Department of Sègre Département du Sègre
- Department of the First French Empire
- 1812–1813
- Location of Sègre in France (1812)
- Capital: Puigcerdà
- History
  - Established: 1812
  - Disestablished: 1813
Preceded by	Succeeded by
Principality of Catalonia	Sègre-Ter
- Today part of: Andorra; Spain

Sègre (French: [sɛɡʁ]) was a department of the First French Empire in present-day Spain and Andorra. Named after the river Segre, it incorporated Andorra. Val d'Aran, which is in the north side of the Pyrenees, was instead incorporated to the department of Haute-Garonne.

Sègre was created on 26 January 1812 when Catalonia was annexed by the French Empire. Its subprefectures were Talarn, and Solsona. Its prefecture was Puigcerdà; the only prefect was Jean Louis Rieul de Viefville des Essarts, from February 1812 to 1813.

In March 1813, it was merged with the department of Ter into the department of Ter-et-Sègre. This merger was established by decree but never published in the Bulletin des lois, nor endorsed by any senatorial decree, leaving its legal status uncertain.

In 1814, the French left the Iberian Peninsula, having occupied it since 1808. The departments disappeared.
