= Ter (department) =

Former French department (1812–1813)

Location of Ter in France (1812)

Ter (French: [tɛʁ]) was a department of the First French Empire in present-day Spain, named after the river Ter. It was created on 26 January 1812 when Catalonia was annexed by the French Empire. Its subprefectures were Vic and Figueres. Its prefecture was Girona; the only prefect was Prudence-Guillaume de Roujoux, from February 1812 to 1813.

In March 1813 it was merged with the department of Sègre into the department of Ter-et-Sègre. This merger was established by decree but never published in the Bulletin des lois, nor endorsed by any senatorial decree (Senatus consultum), leaving its legal status uncertain.

In 1814 the French left the Iberian Peninsula, having occupied it since 1807. The departments disappeared.
