= Montserrat (department) =

Former French department (1812–1813)

Location of Montserrat in France (1812)

Montserrat (French: [mɔ̃.sɛ.ʁa]) was a department of the First French Empire in present-day Spain, named after the mountain of Montserrat. It was created on 26 January 1812 on Catalonia's annexation by the French Empire. Its subprefectures were Manresa and Vilafranca del Penedès. Its prefecture was Barcelona and had only one holder, Achille Libéral Treilhard, from February 1812 to March 1813, when the department was merged with that of Bouches-de-l'Èbre to form the department of Montserrat-et-Bouches-de-l'Èbre (though the civil administration of the area was suppressed and replaced by a military government).
