= Bulletin des lois =

French government gazette (1794–1931)

The Bulletin des lois (from French: Bulletin of the Laws) was a French government gazette published between 1794 and 1931.

It was created during the French Revolution: during the Reign of Terror, the National Convention and its Committee of Public Safety, concerned with channeling and coordinating their actions, felt it necessary to create an organ by which to get news of votes in Paris to various scattered parts of the administration, notably those in the provinces. It was for this purpose that the Bulletin was created, by the Law of 14 Frimaire Year II (December 4, 1793), as an "official anthology of the laws, orders and regulations that govern" the people. A commission was specially created to supervise the sending-out of this publication to all the towns. The first issue of the Bulletin appeared on June 10, 1794 (22 Prairial Year II).

The Bulletin carried the official publication of laws and regulations, and existed alongside the Moniteur universel, used by the government to publish notices, editorials, articles, and various pieces of information of public interest. In 1869, their functions were taken over by the new Journal officiel, although the Bulletin continued to be published in parallel until 1931.
