= Fructidor =

12th month of the French Republican calendar, from mid-August to mid-September

Fructidor (French pronunciation: [fʁyktidɔʁ]) is the twelfth month in the French Republican Calendar. The month was named after the Latin word fructus 'fruit'.

Fructidor is the third month of the summer quarter (mois d'été). By the Gregorian calendar, Fructidor starts on either August 18 or August 19 and ends exactly thirty days later, on September 16 or September 17. Fructidor follows the month of Thermidor and precedes the Sansculottides.

The month is often used as a shorthand term for the Coup of 18 Fructidor.

Year: 3
Month: Fructidor
Year: III

Day of the 10-day
week (décade)
Primidi
Duodi
Tridi
Quartidi
Quintidi
Sextidi
Septidi
Octidi
Nonidi
Décadi

décade 34
| 1 | Tuesday; 18 August 1795 |
| 2 | Wednesday; 19 August 1795 |
| 3 | Thursday; 20 August 1795 |
| 4 | Friday; 21 August 1795 |
| 5 | Saturday; 22 August 1795 |
| 6 | Sunday; 23 August 1795 |
| 7 | Monday; 24 August 1795 |
| 8 | Tuesday; 25 August 1795 |
| 9 | Wednesday; 26 August 1795 |
| 10 | Thursday; 27 August 1795 |

décade 35
| 11 | Friday; 28 August 1795 |
| 12 | Saturday; 29 August 1795 |
| 13 | Sunday; 30 August 1795 |
| 14 | Monday; 31 August 1795 |
| 15 | Tuesday; 1 September 1795 |
| 16 | Wednesday; 2 September 1795 |
| 17 | Thursday; 3 September 1795 |
| 18 | Friday; 4 September 1795 |
| 19 | Saturday; 5 September 1795 |
| 20 | Sunday; 6 September 1795 |

décade 36
| 21 | Monday; 7 September 1795 |
| 22 | Tuesday; 8 September 1795 |
| 23 | Wednesday; 9 September 1795 |
| 24 | Thursday; 10 September 1795 |
| 25 | Friday; 11 September 1795 |
| 26 | Saturday; 12 September 1795 |
| 27 | Sunday; 13 September 1795 |
| 28 | Monday; 14 September 1795 |
| 29 | Tuesday; 15 September 1795 |
| 30 | Wednesday; 16 September 1795 |

Decimal time – 10 h/day
Paris
2h01m05s

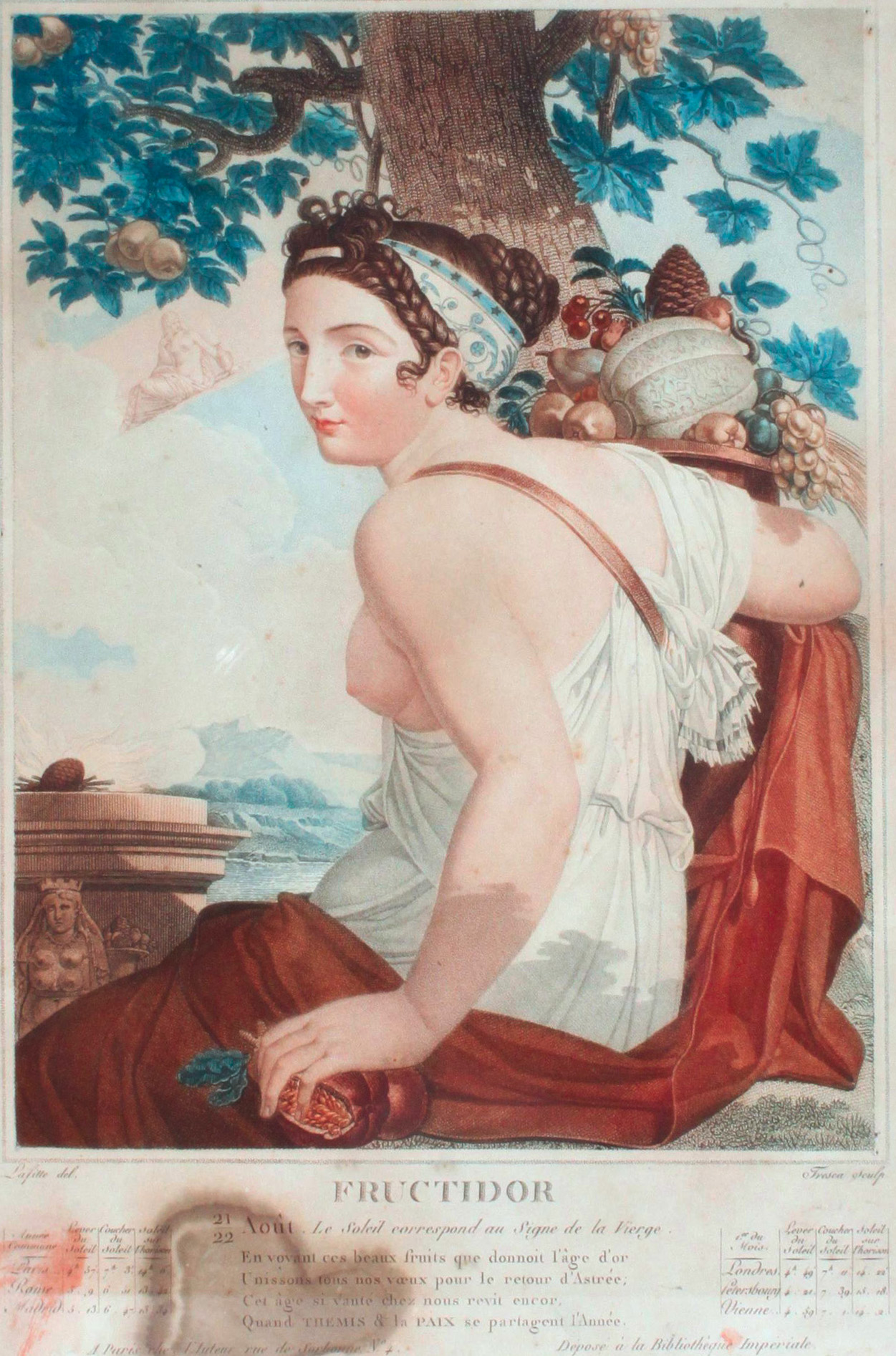
Fructidor

04:40:10
Time of day - 24 h/day
Greenwich

Conversion between Republican and Gregorian calendar for the years I - XIV

Year: 1
Month: Fructidor
Year: I

Day of the 10-day
week (décade)
Primidi
Duodi
Tridi
Quartidi
Quintidi
Sextidi
Septidi
Octidi
Nonidi
Décadi

décade 34
| 1 | Sunday; 18 August 1793 |
| 2 | Monday; 19 August 1793 |
| 3 | Tuesday; 20 August 1793 |
| 4 | Wednesday; 21 August 1793 |
| 5 | Thursday; 22 August 1793 |
| 6 | Friday; 23 August 1793 |
| 7 | Saturday; 24 August 1793 |
| 8 | Sunday; 25 August 1793 |
| 9 | Monday; 26 August 1793 |
| 10 | Tuesday; 27 August 1793 |

décade 35
| 11 | Wednesday; 28 August 1793 |
| 12 | Thursday; 29 August 1793 |
| 13 | Friday; 30 August 1793 |
| 14 | Saturday; 31 August 1793 |
| 15 | Sunday; 1 September 1793 |
| 16 | Monday; 2 September 1793 |
| 17 | Tuesday; 3 September 1793 |
| 18 | Wednesday; 4 September 1793 |
| 19 | Thursday; 5 September 1793 |
| 20 | Friday; 6 September 1793 |

décade 36
| 21 | Saturday; 7 September 1793 |
| 22 | Sunday; 8 September 1793 |
| 23 | Monday; 9 September 1793 |
| 24 | Tuesday; 10 September 1793 |
| 25 | Wednesday; 11 September 1793 |
| 26 | Thursday; 12 September 1793 |
| 27 | Friday; 13 September 1793 |
| 28 | Saturday; 14 September 1793 |
| 29 | Sunday; 15 September 1793 |
| 30 | Monday; 16 September 1793 |

Decimal time – 10 h/day
Paris
1:94:56

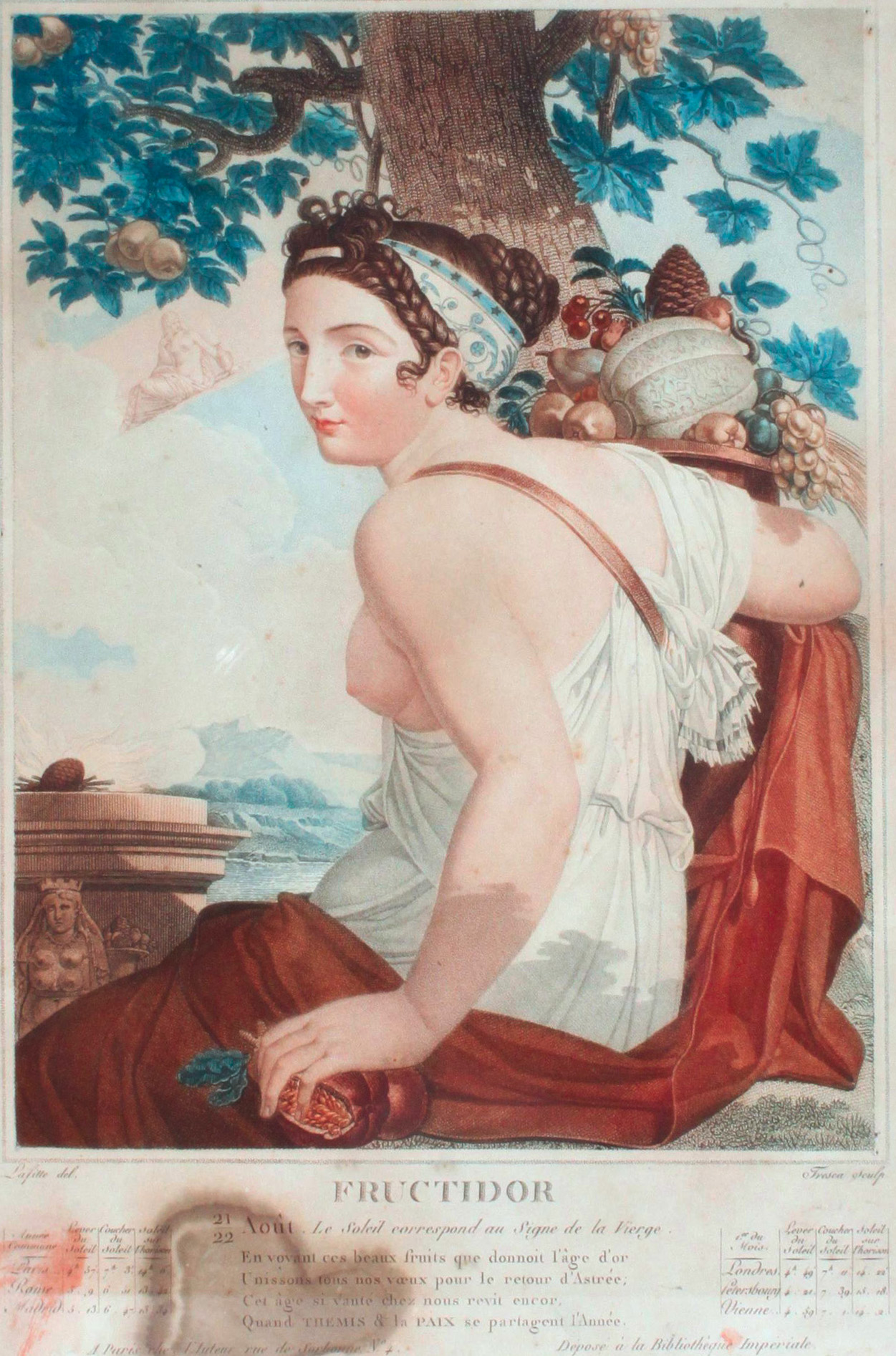
Fructidor

04:40:10
Time of day - 24 h/day
Greenwich

Year: 2
Month: Fructidor
Year: II

Day of the 10-day
week (décade)
Primidi
Duodi
Tridi
Quartidi
Quintidi
Sextidi
Septidi
Octidi
Nonidi
Décadi

décade 34
| 1 | Monday; 18 August 1794 |
| 2 | Tuesday; 19 August 1794 |
| 3 | Wednesday; 20 August 1794 |
| 4 | Thursday; 21 August 1794 |
| 5 | Friday; 22 August 1794 |
| 6 | Saturday; 23 August 1794 |
| 7 | Sunday; 24 August 1794 |
| 8 | Monday; 25 August 1794 |
| 9 | Tuesday; 26 August 1794 |
| 10 | Wednesday; 27 August 1794 |

décade 35
| 11 | Thursday; 28 August 1794 |
| 12 | Friday; 29 August 1794 |
| 13 | Saturday; 30 August 1794 |
| 14 | Sunday; 31 August 1794 |
| 15 | Monday; 1 September 1794 |
| 16 | Tuesday; 2 September 1794 |
| 17 | Wednesday; 3 September 1794 |
| 18 | Thursday; 4 September 1794 |
| 19 | Friday; 5 September 1794 |
| 20 | Saturday; 6 September 1794 |

décade 36
| 21 | Sunday; 7 September 1794 |
| 22 | Monday; 8 September 1794 |
| 23 | Tuesday; 9 September 1794 |
| 24 | Wednesday; 10 September 1794 |
| 25 | Thursday; 11 September 1794 |
| 26 | Friday; 12 September 1794 |
| 27 | Saturday; 13 September 1794 |
| 28 | Sunday; 14 September 1794 |
| 29 | Monday; 15 September 1794 |
| 30 | Tuesday; 16 September 1794 |

Decimal time – 10 h/day
Paris
1:94:56

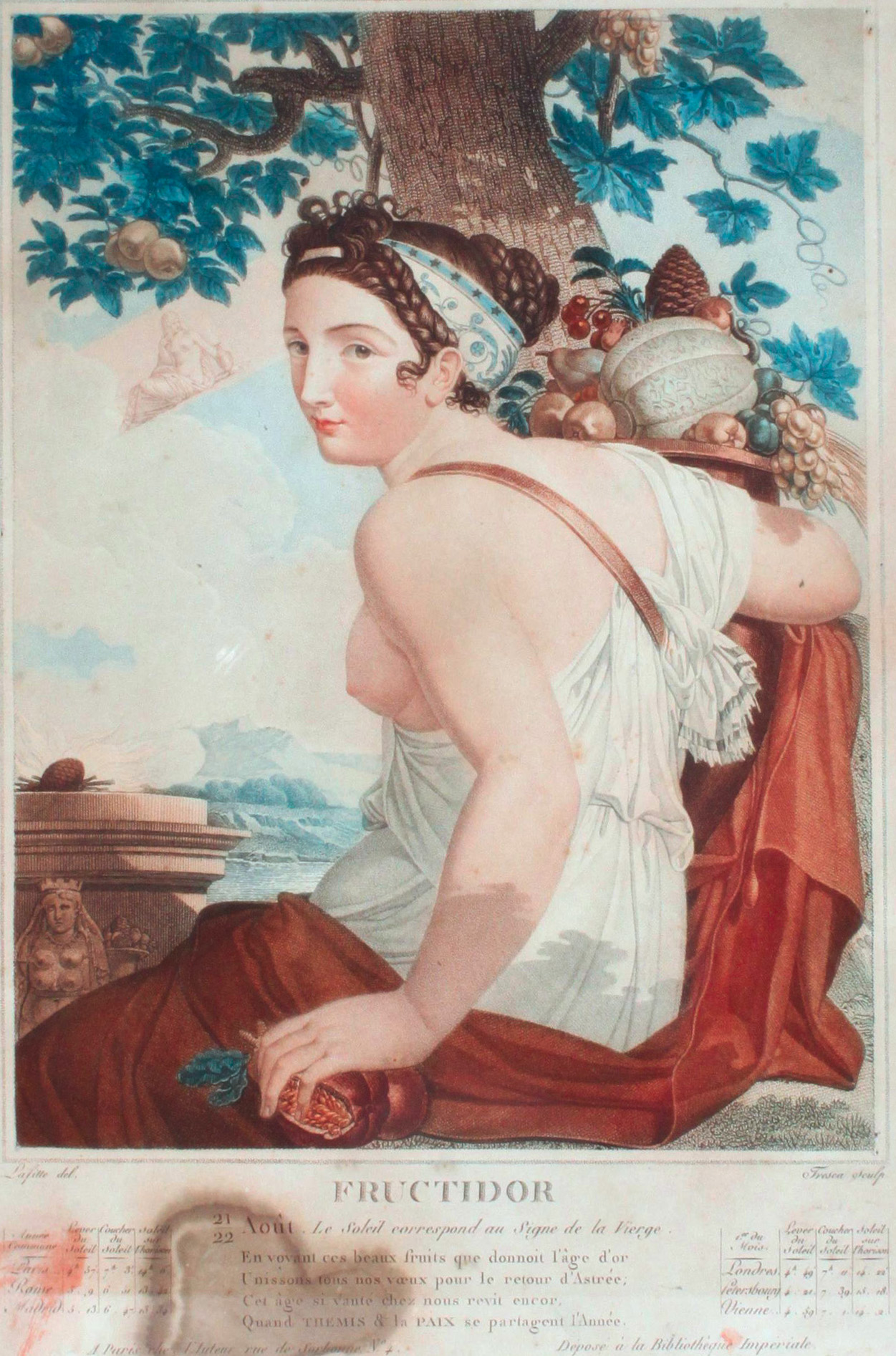
Fructidor

04:40:10
Time of day - 24 h/day
Greenwich

Year: 3
Month: Fructidor
Year: III

Day of the 10-day
week (décade)
Primidi
Duodi
Tridi
Quartidi
Quintidi
Sextidi
Septidi
Octidi
Nonidi
Décadi

décade 34
| 1 | Tuesday; 18 August 1795 |
| 2 | Wednesday; 19 August 1795 |
| 3 | Thursday; 20 August 1795 |
| 4 | Friday; 21 August 1795 |
| 5 | Saturday; 22 August 1795 |
| 6 | Sunday; 23 August 1795 |
| 7 | Monday; 24 August 1795 |
| 8 | Tuesday; 25 August 1795 |
| 9 | Wednesday; 26 August 1795 |
| 10 | Thursday; 27 August 1795 |

décade 35
| 11 | Friday; 28 August 1795 |
| 12 | Saturday; 29 August 1795 |
| 13 | Sunday; 30 August 1795 |
| 14 | Monday; 31 August 1795 |
| 15 | Tuesday; 1 September 1795 |
| 16 | Wednesday; 2 September 1795 |
| 17 | Thursday; 3 September 1795 |
| 18 | Friday; 4 September 1795 |
| 19 | Saturday; 5 September 1795 |
| 20 | Sunday; 6 September 1795 |

décade 36
| 21 | Monday; 7 September 1795 |
| 22 | Tuesday; 8 September 1795 |
| 23 | Wednesday; 9 September 1795 |
| 24 | Thursday; 10 September 1795 |
| 25 | Friday; 11 September 1795 |
| 26 | Saturday; 12 September 1795 |
| 27 | Sunday; 13 September 1795 |
| 28 | Monday; 14 September 1795 |
| 29 | Tuesday; 15 September 1795 |
| 30 | Wednesday; 16 September 1795 |

Decimal time – 10 h/day
Paris
1:94:56

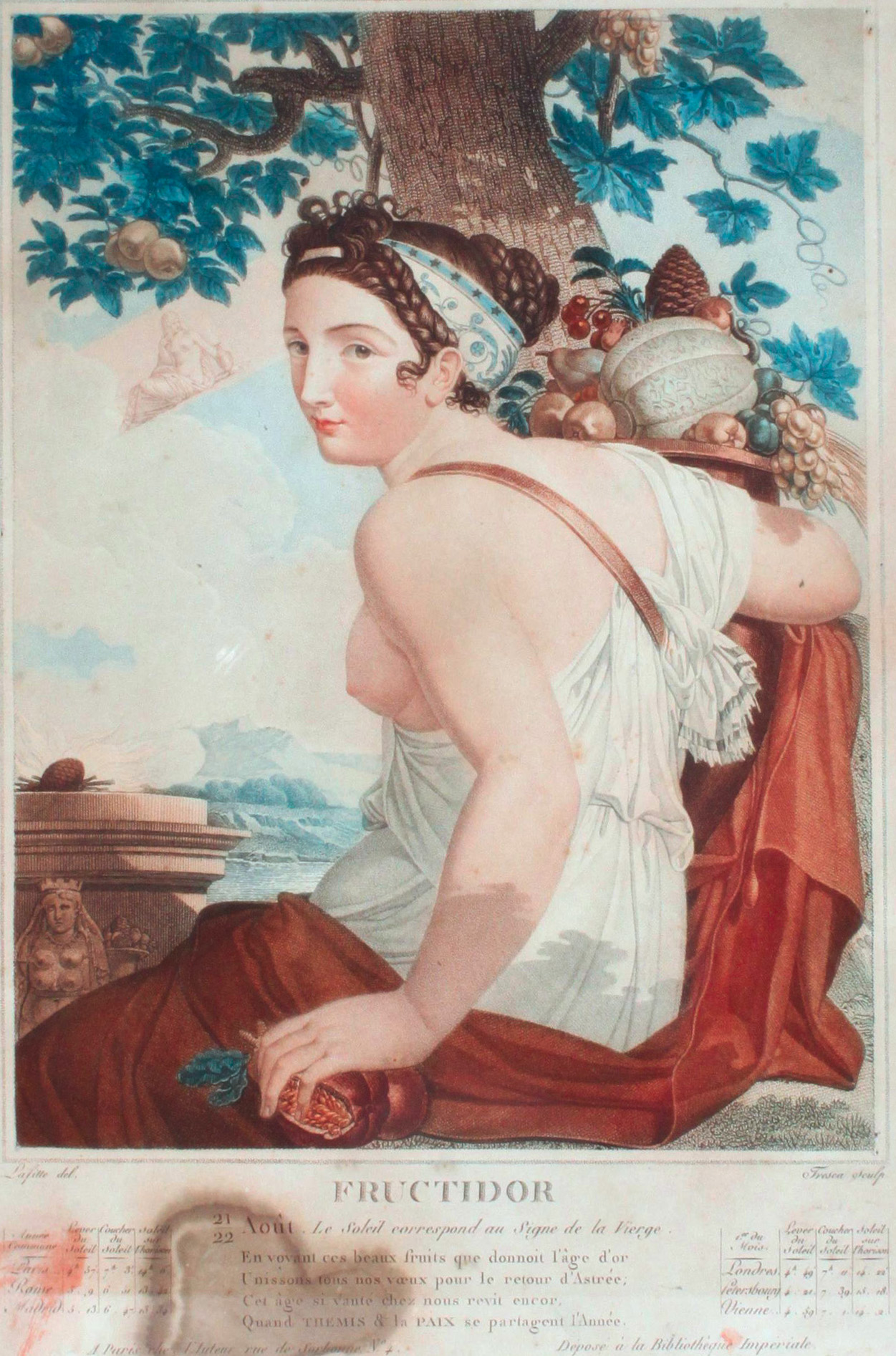
Fructidor

04:40:10
Time of day - 24 h/day
Greenwich

Year: 4
Month: Fructidor
Year: IV

Day of the 10-day
week (décade)
Primidi
Duodi
Tridi
Quartidi
Quintidi
Sextidi
Septidi
Octidi
Nonidi
Décadi

décade 34
| 1 | Thursday; 18 August 1796 |
| 2 | Friday; 19 August 1796 |
| 3 | Saturday; 20 August 1796 |
| 4 | Sunday; 21 August 1796 |
| 5 | Monday; 22 August 1796 |
| 6 | Tuesday; 23 August 1796 |
| 7 | Wednesday; 24 August 1796 |
| 8 | Thursday; 25 August 1796 |
| 9 | Friday; 26 August 1796 |
| 10 | Saturday; 27 August 1796 |

décade 35
| 11 | Sunday; 28 August 1796 |
| 12 | Monday; 29 August 1796 |
| 13 | Tuesday; 30 August 1796 |
| 14 | Wednesday; 31 August 1796 |
| 15 | Thursday; 1 September 1796 |
| 16 | Friday; 2 September 1796 |
| 17 | Saturday; 3 September 1796 |
| 18 | Sunday; 4 September 1796 |
| 19 | Monday; 5 September 1796 |
| 20 | Tuesday; 6 September 1796 |

décade 36
| 21 | Wednesday; 7 September 1796 |
| 22 | Thursday; 8 September 1796 |
| 23 | Friday; 9 September 1796 |
| 24 | Saturday; 10 September 1796 |
| 25 | Sunday; 11 September 1796 |
| 26 | Monday; 12 September 1796 |
| 27 | Tuesday; 13 September 1796 |
| 28 | Wednesday; 14 September 1796 |
| 29 | Thursday; 15 September 1796 |
| 30 | Friday; 16 September 1796 |

Decimal time – 10 h/day
Paris
1:94:56

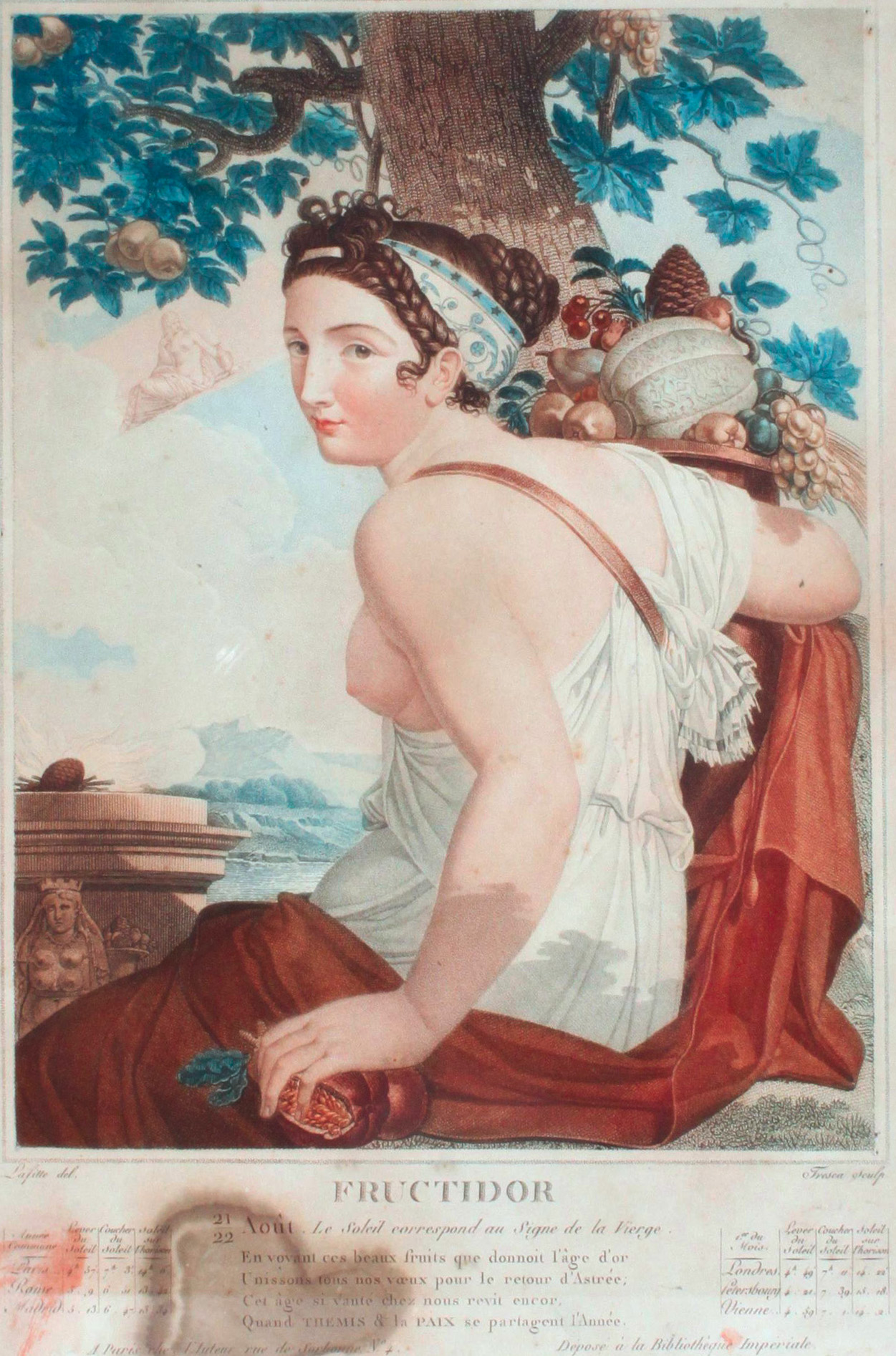
Fructidor

04:40:10
Time of day - 24 h/day
Greenwich

Year: 5
Month: Fructidor
Year: V

Day of the 10-day
week (décade)
Primidi
Duodi
Tridi
Quartidi
Quintidi
Sextidi
Septidi
Octidi
Nonidi
Décadi

décade 34
| 1 | Friday; 18 August 1797 |
| 2 | Saturday; 19 August 1797 |
| 3 | Sunday; 20 August 1797 |
| 4 | Monday; 21 August 1797 |
| 5 | Tuesday; 22 August 1797 |
| 6 | Wednesday; 23 August 1797 |
| 7 | Thursday; 24 August 1797 |
| 8 | Friday; 25 August 1797 |
| 9 | Saturday; 26 August 1797 |
| 10 | Sunday; 27 August 1797 |

décade 35
| 11 | Monday; 28 August 1797 |
| 12 | Tuesday; 29 August 1797 |
| 13 | Wednesday; 30 August 1797 |
| 14 | Thursday; 31 August 1797 |
| 15 | Friday; 1 September 1797 |
| 16 | Saturday; 2 September 1797 |
| 17 | Sunday; 3 September 1797 |
| 18 | Monday; 4 September 1797 |
| 19 | Tuesday; 5 September 1797 |
| 20 | Wednesday; 6 September 1797 |

décade 36
| 21 | Thursday; 7 September 1797 |
| 22 | Friday; 8 September 1797 |
| 23 | Saturday; 9 September 1797 |
| 24 | Sunday; 10 September 1797 |
| 25 | Monday; 11 September 1797 |
| 26 | Tuesday; 12 September 1797 |
| 27 | Wednesday; 13 September 1797 |
| 28 | Thursday; 14 September 1797 |
| 29 | Friday; 15 September 1797 |
| 30 | Saturday; 16 September 1797 |

Decimal time – 10 h/day
Paris
1:94:56

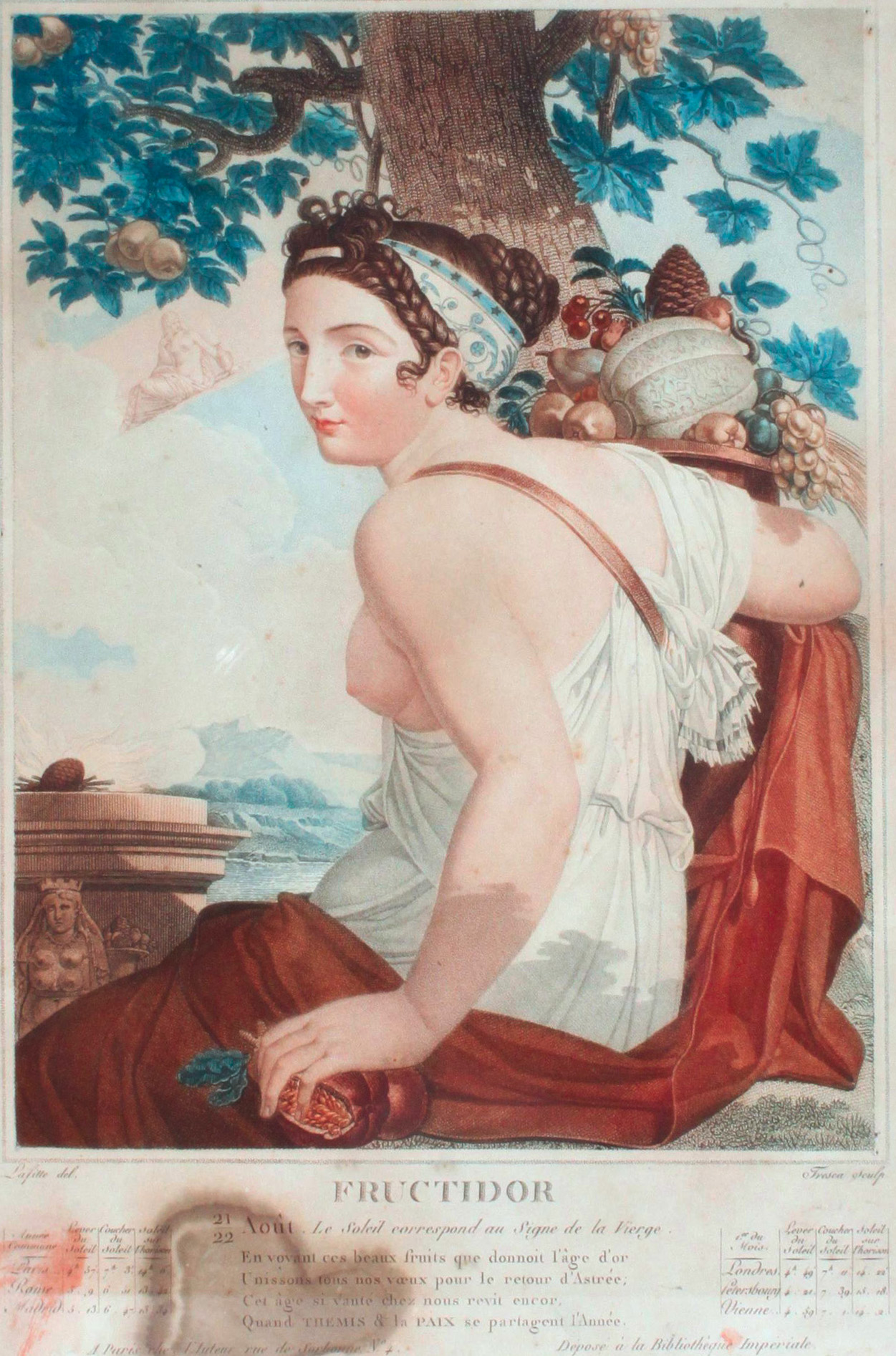
Fructidor

04:40:10
Time of day - 24 h/day
Greenwich

Year: 6
Month: Fructidor
Year: VI

Day of the 10-day
week (décade)
Primidi
Duodi
Tridi
Quartidi
Quintidi
Sextidi
Septidi
Octidi
Nonidi
Décadi

décade 34
| 1 | Saturday; 18 August 1798 |
| 2 | Sunday; 19 August 1798 |
| 3 | Monday; 20 August 1798 |
| 4 | Tuesday; 21 August 1798 |
| 5 | Wednesday; 22 August 1798 |
| 6 | Thursday; 23 August 1798 |
| 7 | Friday; 24 August 1798 |
| 8 | Saturday; 25 August 1798 |
| 9 | Sunday; 26 August 1798 |
| 10 | Monday; 27 August 1798 |

décade 35
| 11 | Tuesday; 28 August 1798 |
| 12 | Wednesday; 29 August 1798 |
| 13 | Thursday; 30 August 1798 |
| 14 | Friday; 31 August 1798 |
| 15 | Saturday; 1 September 1798 |
| 16 | Sunday; 2 September 1798 |
| 17 | Monday; 3 September 1798 |
| 18 | Tuesday; 4 September 1798 |
| 19 | Wednesday; 5 September 1798 |
| 20 | Thursday; 6 September 1798 |

décade 36
| 21 | Friday; 7 September 1798 |
| 22 | Saturday; 8 September 1798 |
| 23 | Sunday; 9 September 1798 |
| 24 | Monday; 10 September 1798 |
| 25 | Tuesday; 11 September 1798 |
| 26 | Wednesday; 12 September 1798 |
| 27 | Thursday; 13 September 1798 |
| 28 | Friday; 14 September 1798 |
| 29 | Saturday; 15 September 1798 |
| 30 | Sunday; 16 September 1798 |

Decimal time – 10 h/day
Paris
1:94:56

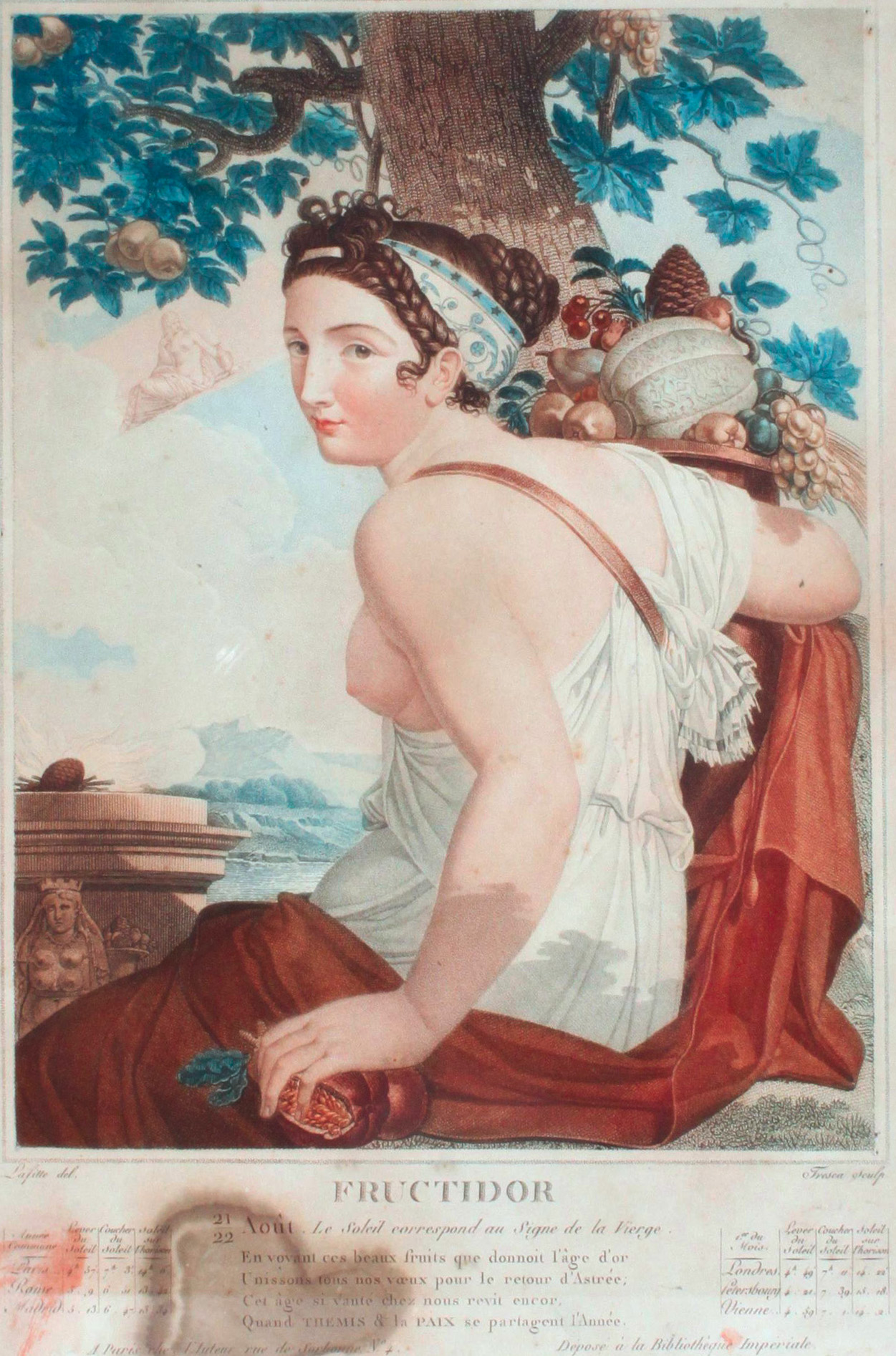
Fructidor

04:40:10
Time of day - 24 h/day
Greenwich

Year: 7
Month: Fructidor
Year: VII

Day of the 10-day
week (décade)
Primidi
Duodi
Tridi
Quartidi
Quintidi
Sextidi
Septidi
Octidi
Nonidi
Décadi

décade 34
| 1 | Sunday; 18 August 1799 |
| 2 | Monday; 19 August 1799 |
| 3 | Tuesday; 20 August 1799 |
| 4 | Wednesday; 21 August 1799 |
| 5 | Thursday; 22 August 1799 |
| 6 | Friday; 23 August 1799 |
| 7 | Saturday; 24 August 1799 |
| 8 | Sunday; 25 August 1799 |
| 9 | Monday; 26 August 1799 |
| 10 | Tuesday; 27 August 1799 |

décade 35
| 11 | Wednesday; 28 August 1799 |
| 12 | Thursday; 29 August 1799 |
| 13 | Friday; 30 August 1799 |
| 14 | Saturday; 31 August 1799 |
| 15 | Sunday; 1 September 1799 |
| 16 | Monday; 2 September 1799 |
| 17 | Tuesday; 3 September 1799 |
| 18 | Wednesday; 4 September 1799 |
| 19 | Thursday; 5 September 1799 |
| 20 | Friday; 6 September 1799 |

décade 36
| 21 | Saturday; 7 September 1799 |
| 22 | Sunday; 8 September 1799 |
| 23 | Monday; 9 September 1799 |
| 24 | Tuesday; 10 September 1799 |
| 25 | Wednesday; 11 September 1799 |
| 26 | Thursday; 12 September 1799 |
| 27 | Friday; 13 September 1799 |
| 28 | Saturday; 14 September 1799 |
| 29 | Sunday; 15 September 1799 |
| 30 | Monday; 16 September 1799 |

Decimal time – 10 h/day
Paris
1:94:56

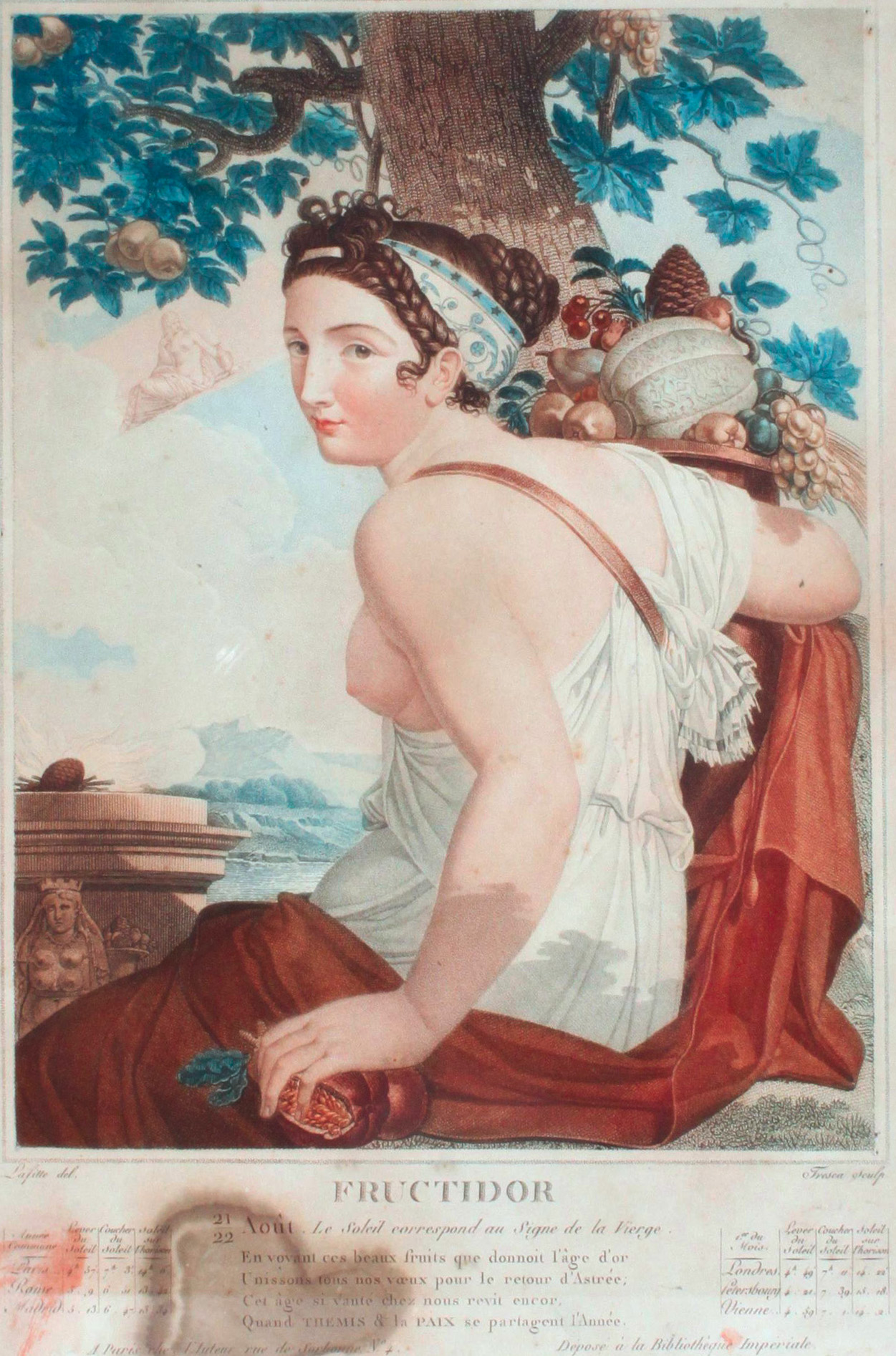
Fructidor

04:40:10
Time of day - 24 h/day
Greenwich

Year: 8
Month: Fructidor
Year: VIII

Day of the 10-day
week (décade)
Primidi
Duodi
Tridi
Quartidi
Quintidi
Sextidi
Septidi
Octidi
Nonidi
Décadi

décade 34
| 1 | Tuesday; 19 August 1800 |
| 2 | Wednesday; 20 August 1800 |
| 3 | Thursday; 21 August 1800 |
| 4 | Friday; 22 August 1800 |
| 5 | Saturday; 23 August 1800 |
| 6 | Sunday; 24 August 1800 |
| 7 | Monday; 25 August 1800 |
| 8 | Tuesday; 26 August 1800 |
| 9 | Wednesday; 27 August 1800 |
| 10 | Thursday; 28 August 1800 |

décade 35
| 11 | Friday; 29 August 1800 |
| 12 | Saturday; 30 August 1800 |
| 13 | Sunday; 31 August 1800 |
| 14 | Monday; 1 September 1800 |
| 15 | Tuesday; 2 September 1800 |
| 16 | Wednesday; 3 September 1800 |
| 17 | Thursday; 4 September 1800 |
| 18 | Friday; 5 September 1800 |
| 19 | Saturday; 6 September 1800 |
| 20 | Sunday; 7 September 1800 |

décade 36
| 21 | Monday; 8 September 1800 |
| 22 | Tuesday; 9 September 1800 |
| 23 | Wednesday; 10 September 1800 |
| 24 | Thursday; 11 September 1800 |
| 25 | Friday; 12 September 1800 |
| 26 | Saturday; 13 September 1800 |
| 27 | Sunday; 14 September 1800 |
| 28 | Monday; 15 September 1800 |
| 29 | Tuesday; 16 September 1800 |
| 30 | Wednesday; 17 September 1800 |

Decimal time – 10 h/day
Paris
1:94:56

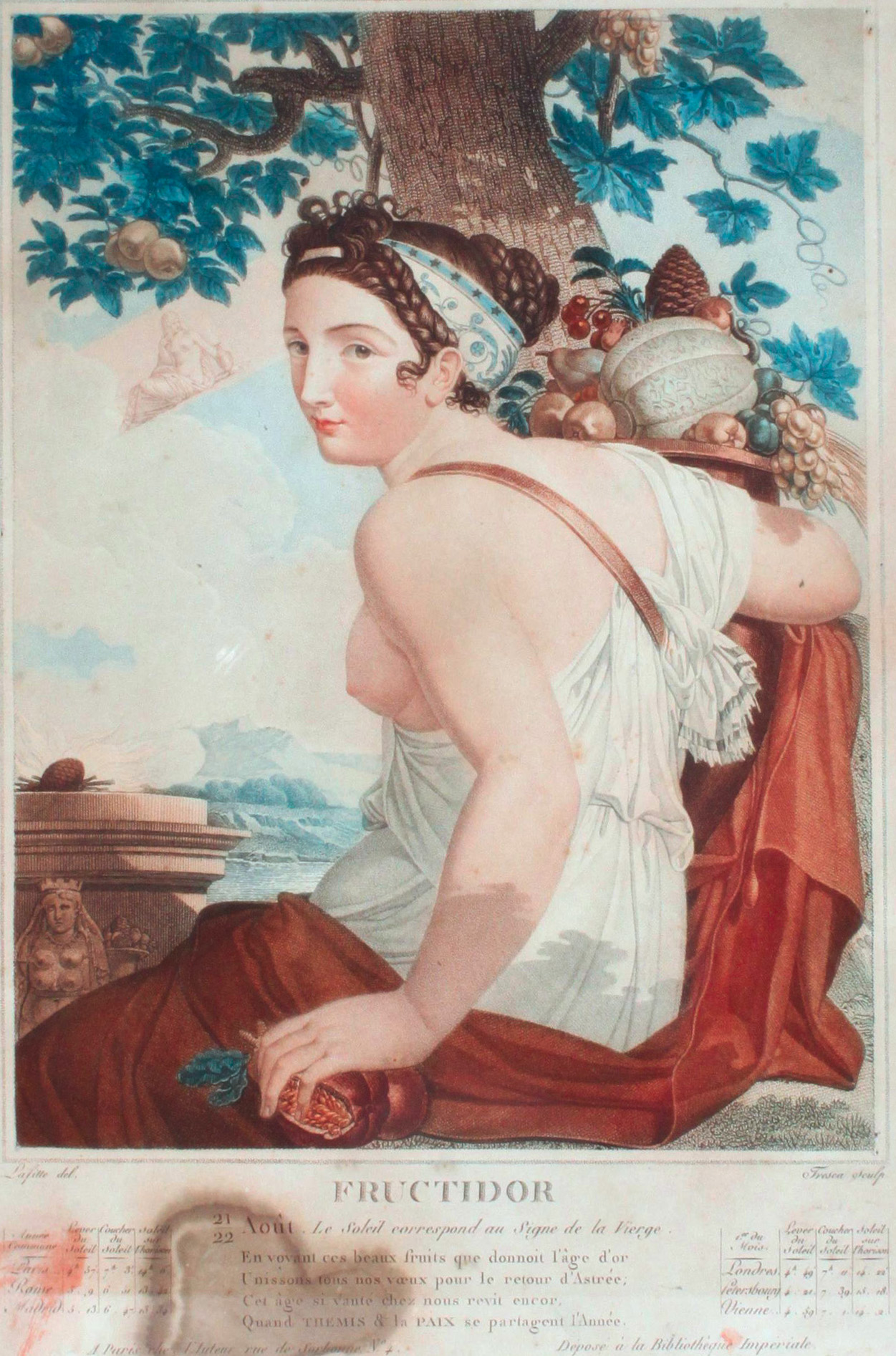
Fructidor

04:40:10
Time of day - 24 h/day
Greenwich

Year: 9
Month: Fructidor
Year: IX

Day of the 10-day
week (décade)
Primidi
Duodi
Tridi
Quartidi
Quintidi
Sextidi
Septidi
Octidi
Nonidi
Décadi

décade 34
| 1 | Wednesday; 19 August 1801 |
| 2 | Thursday; 20 August 1801 |
| 3 | Friday; 21 August 1801 |
| 4 | Saturday; 22 August 1801 |
| 5 | Sunday; 23 August 1801 |
| 6 | Monday; 24 August 1801 |
| 7 | Tuesday; 25 August 1801 |
| 8 | Wednesday; 26 August 1801 |
| 9 | Thursday; 27 August 1801 |
| 10 | Friday; 28 August 1801 |

décade 35
| 11 | Saturday; 29 August 1801 |
| 12 | Sunday; 30 August 1801 |
| 13 | Monday; 31 August 1801 |
| 14 | Tuesday; 1 September 1801 |
| 15 | Wednesday; 2 September 1801 |
| 16 | Thursday; 3 September 1801 |
| 17 | Friday; 4 September 1801 |
| 18 | Saturday; 5 September 1801 |
| 19 | Sunday; 6 September 1801 |
| 20 | Monday; 7 September 1801 |

décade 36
| 21 | Tuesday; 8 September 1801 |
| 22 | Wednesday; 9 September 1801 |
| 23 | Thursday; 10 September 1801 |
| 24 | Friday; 11 September 1801 |
| 25 | Saturday; 12 September 1801 |
| 26 | Sunday; 13 September 1801 |
| 27 | Monday; 14 September 1801 |
| 28 | Tuesday; 15 September 1801 |
| 29 | Wednesday; 16 September 1801 |
| 30 | Thursday; 17 September 1801 |

Decimal time – 10 h/day
Paris
1:94:56

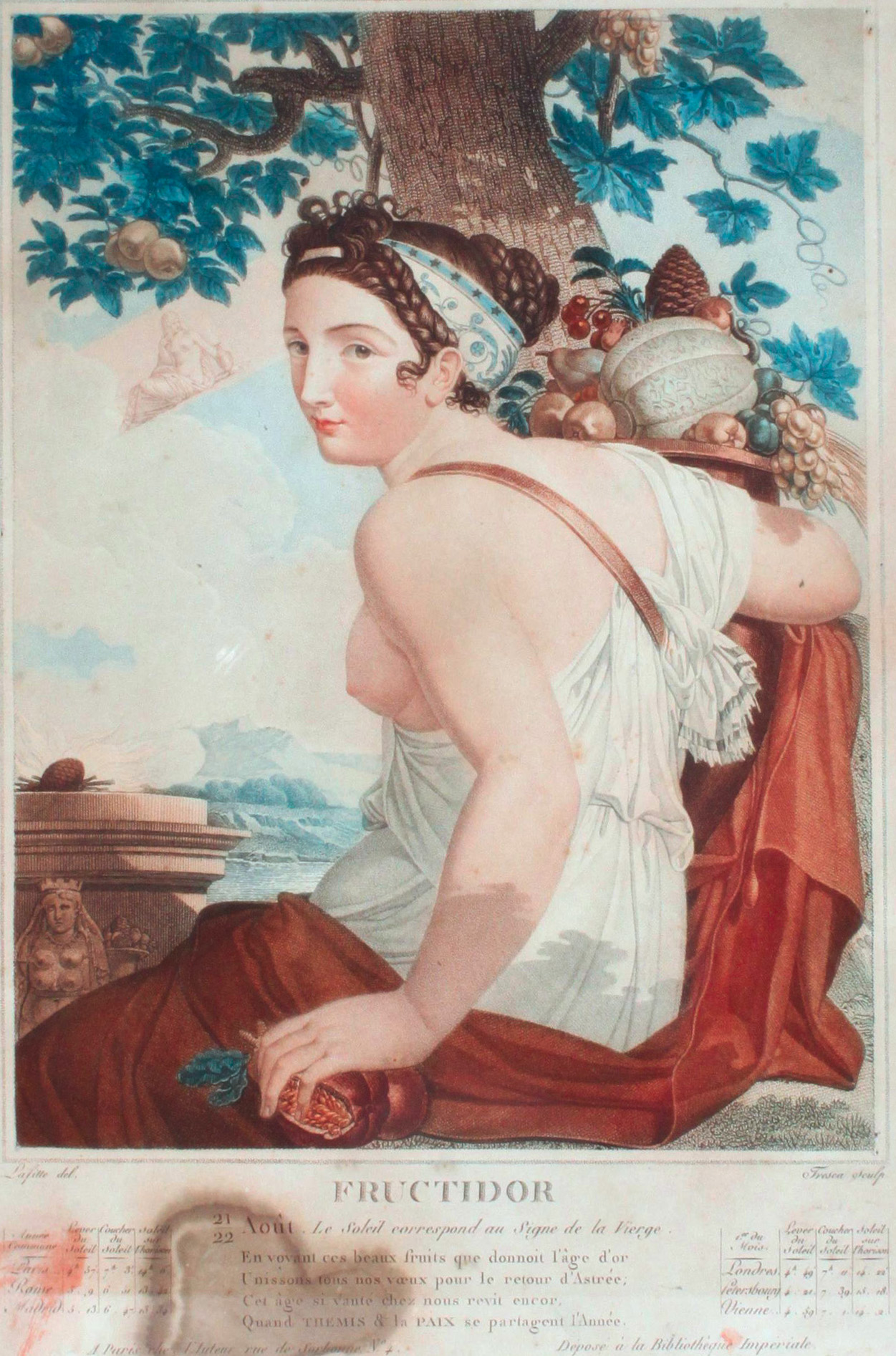
Fructidor

04:40:10
Time of day - 24 h/day
Greenwich

Year: 10
Month: Fructidor
Year: X

Day of the 10-day
week (décade)
Primidi
Duodi
Tridi
Quartidi
Quintidi
Sextidi
Septidi
Octidi
Nonidi
Décadi

décade 34
| 1 | Thursday; 19 August 1802 |
| 2 | Friday; 20 August 1802 |
| 3 | Saturday; 21 August 1802 |
| 4 | Sunday; 22 August 1802 |
| 5 | Monday; 23 August 1802 |
| 6 | Tuesday; 24 August 1802 |
| 7 | Wednesday; 25 August 1802 |
| 8 | Thursday; 26 August 1802 |
| 9 | Friday; 27 August 1802 |
| 10 | Saturday; 28 August 1802 |

décade 35
| 11 | Sunday; 29 August 1802 |
| 12 | Monday; 30 August 1802 |
| 13 | Tuesday; 31 August 1802 |
| 14 | Wednesday; 1 September 1802 |
| 15 | Thursday; 2 September 1802 |
| 16 | Friday; 3 September 1802 |
| 17 | Saturday; 4 September 1802 |
| 18 | Sunday; 5 September 1802 |
| 19 | Monday; 6 September 1802 |
| 20 | Tuesday; 7 September 1802 |

décade 36
| 21 | Wednesday; 8 September 1802 |
| 22 | Thursday; 9 September 1802 |
| 23 | Friday; 10 September 1802 |
| 24 | Saturday; 11 September 1802 |
| 25 | Sunday; 12 September 1802 |
| 26 | Monday; 13 September 1802 |
| 27 | Tuesday; 14 September 1802 |
| 28 | Wednesday; 15 September 1802 |
| 29 | Thursday; 16 September 1802 |
| 30 | Friday; 17 September 1802 |

Decimal time – 10 h/day
Paris
1:94:56

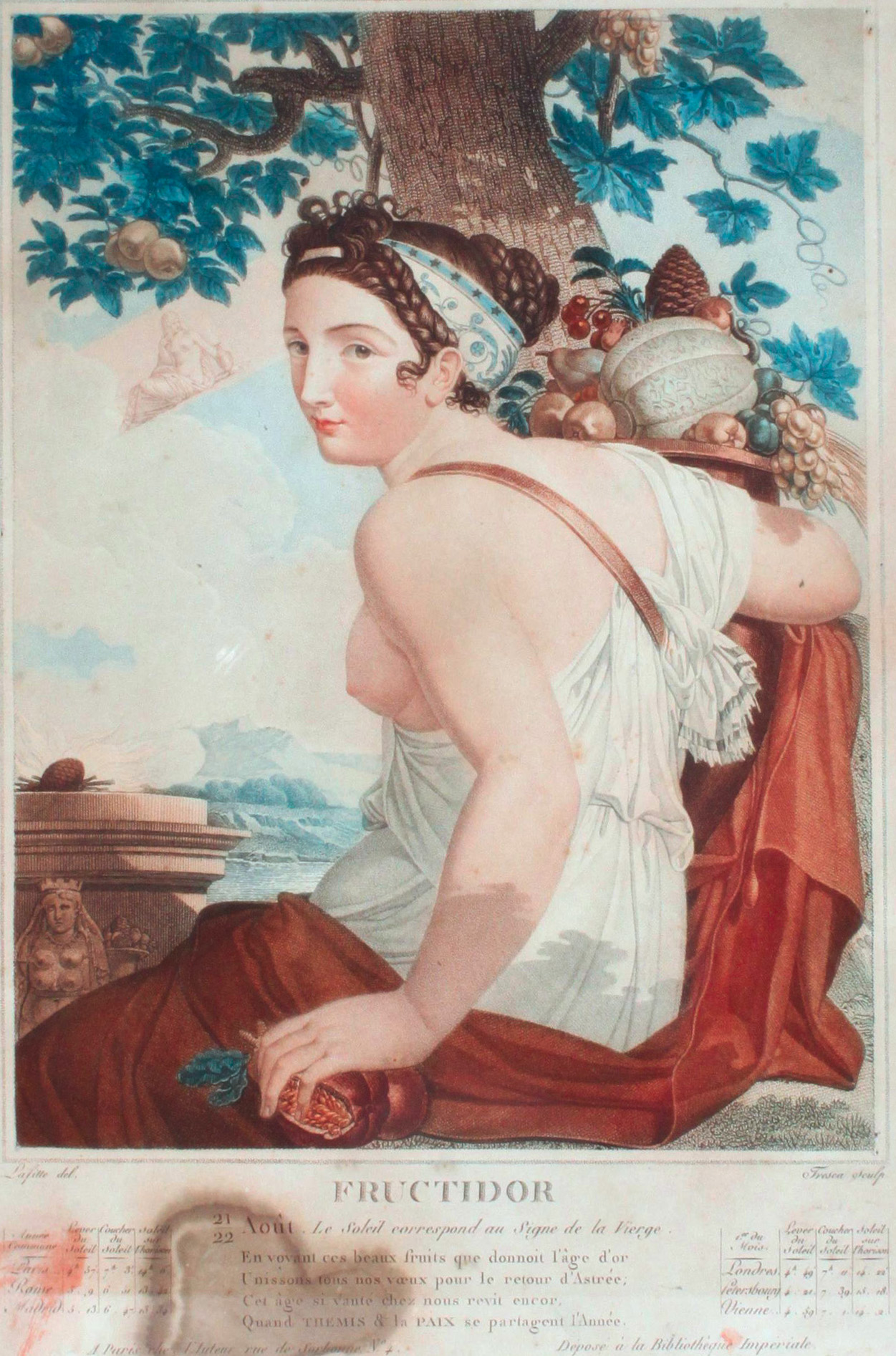
Fructidor

04:40:10
Time of day - 24 h/day
Greenwich

Year: 11
Month: Fructidor
Year: XI

Day of the 10-day
week (décade)
Primidi
Duodi
Tridi
Quartidi
Quintidi
Sextidi
Septidi
Octidi
Nonidi
Décadi

décade 34
| 1 | Friday; 19 August 1803 |
| 2 | Saturday; 20 August 1803 |
| 3 | Sunday; 21 August 1803 |
| 4 | Monday; 22 August 1803 |
| 5 | Tuesday; 23 August 1803 |
| 6 | Wednesday; 24 August 1803 |
| 7 | Thursday; 25 August 1803 |
| 8 | Friday; 26 August 1803 |
| 9 | Saturday; 27 August 1803 |
| 10 | Sunday; 28 August 1803 |

décade 35
| 11 | Monday; 29 August 1803 |
| 12 | Tuesday; 30 August 1803 |
| 13 | Wednesday; 31 August 1803 |
| 14 | Thursday; 1 September 1803 |
| 15 | Friday; 2 September 1803 |
| 16 | Saturday; 3 September 1803 |
| 17 | Sunday; 4 September 1803 |
| 18 | Monday; 5 September 1803 |
| 19 | Tuesday; 6 September 1803 |
| 20 | Wednesday; 7 September 1803 |

décade 36
| 21 | Thursday; 8 September 1803 |
| 22 | Friday; 9 September 1803 |
| 23 | Saturday; 10 September 1803 |
| 24 | Sunday; 11 September 1803 |
| 25 | Monday; 12 September 1803 |
| 26 | Tuesday; 13 September 1803 |
| 27 | Wednesday; 14 September 1803 |
| 28 | Thursday; 15 September 1803 |
| 29 | Friday; 16 September 1803 |
| 30 | Saturday; 17 September 1803 |

Decimal time – 10 h/day
Paris
1:94:56

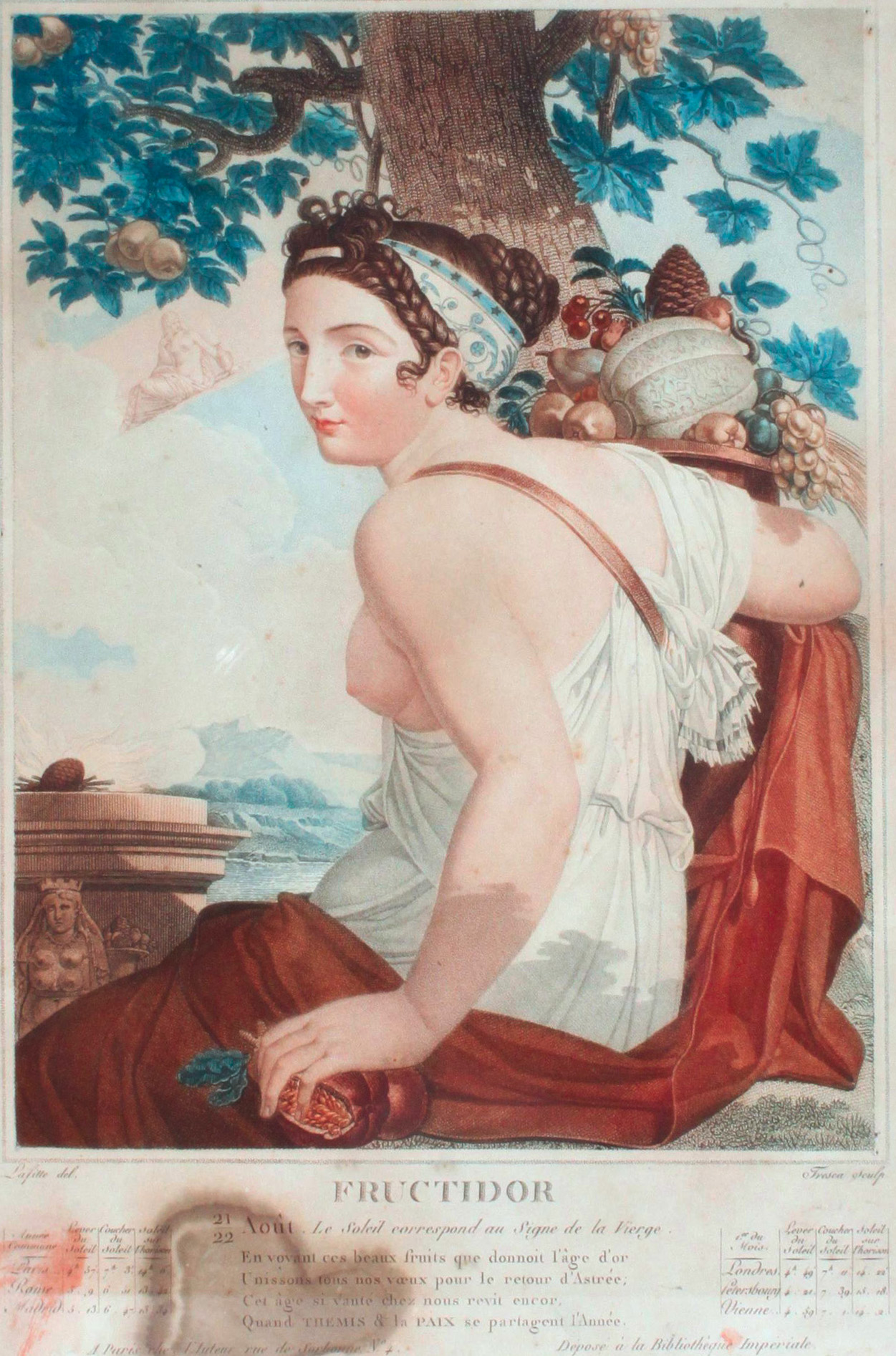
Fructidor

04:40:10
Time of day - 24 h/day
Greenwich

Year: 12
Month: Fructidor
Year: XII

Day of the 10-day
week (décade)
Primidi
Duodi
Tridi
Quartidi
Quintidi
Sextidi
Septidi
Octidi
Nonidi
Décadi

décade 34
| 1 | Sunday; 19 August 1804 |
| 2 | Monday; 20 August 1804 |
| 3 | Tuesday; 21 August 1804 |
| 4 | Wednesday; 22 August 1804 |
| 5 | Thursday; 23 August 1804 |
| 6 | Friday; 24 August 1804 |
| 7 | Saturday; 25 August 1804 |
| 8 | Sunday; 26 August 1804 |
| 9 | Monday; 27 August 1804 |
| 10 | Tuesday; 28 August 1804 |

décade 35
| 11 | Wednesday; 29 August 1804 |
| 12 | Thursday; 30 August 1804 |
| 13 | Friday; 31 August 1804 |
| 14 | Saturday; 1 September 1804 |
| 15 | Sunday; 2 September 1804 |
| 16 | Monday; 3 September 1804 |
| 17 | Tuesday; 4 September 1804 |
| 18 | Wednesday; 5 September 1804 |
| 19 | Thursday; 6 September 1804 |
| 20 | Friday; 7 September 1804 |

décade 36
| 21 | Saturday; 8 September 1804 |
| 22 | Sunday; 9 September 1804 |
| 23 | Monday; 10 September 1804 |
| 24 | Tuesday; 11 September 1804 |
| 25 | Wednesday; 12 September 1804 |
| 26 | Thursday; 13 September 1804 |
| 27 | Friday; 14 September 1804 |
| 28 | Saturday; 15 September 1804 |
| 29 | Sunday; 16 September 1804 |
| 30 | Monday; 17 September 1804 |

Decimal time – 10 h/day
Paris
1:94:56

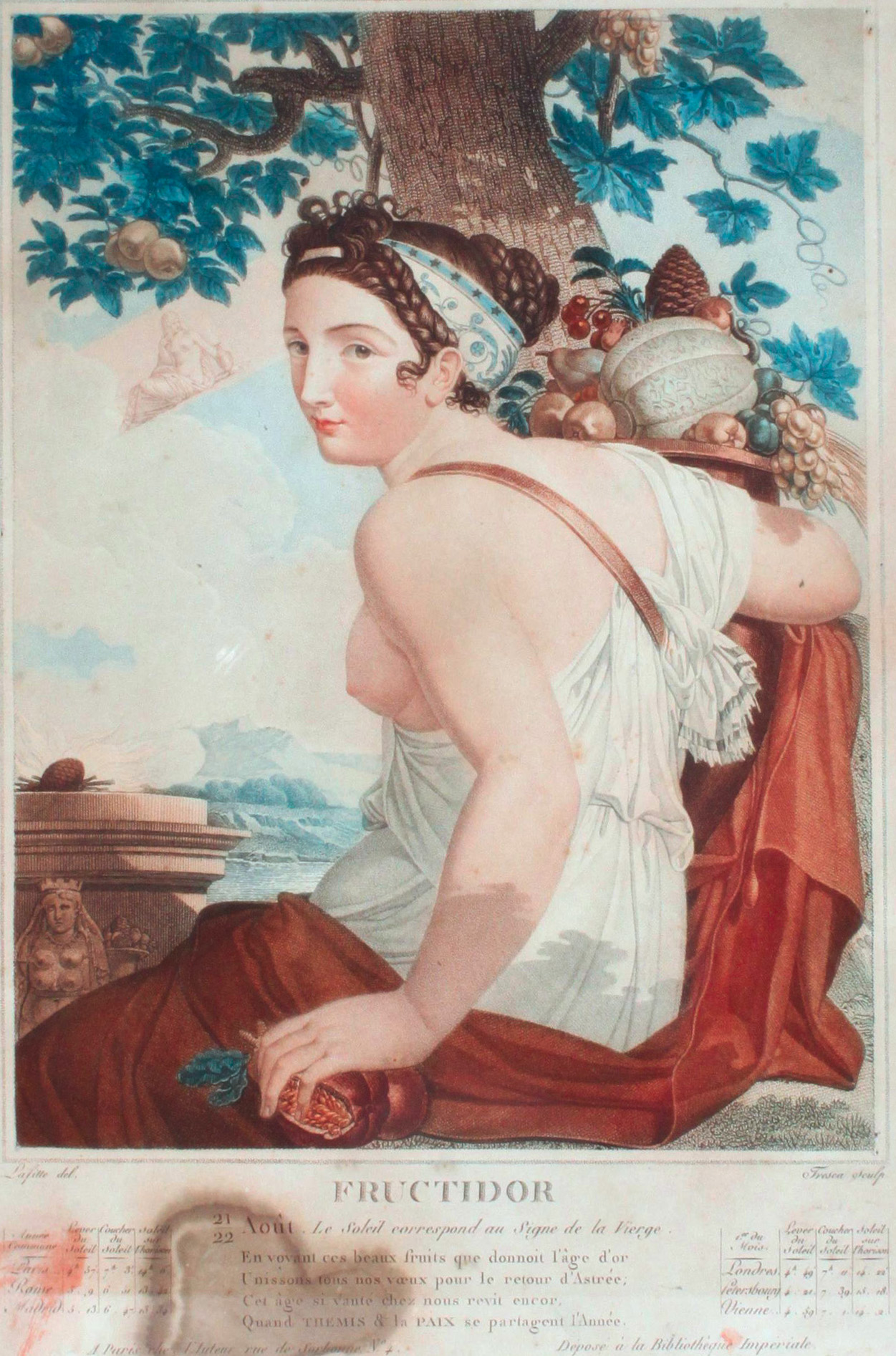
Fructidor

04:40:10
Time of day - 24 h/day
Greenwich

Year: 13
Month: Fructidor
Year: XIII

Day of the 10-day
week (décade)
Primidi
Duodi
Tridi
Quartidi
Quintidi
Sextidi
Septidi
Octidi
Nonidi
Décadi

décade 34
| 1 | Monday; 19 August 1805 |
| 2 | Tuesday; 20 August 1805 |
| 3 | Wednesday; 21 August 1805 |
| 4 | Thursday; 22 August 1805 |
| 5 | Friday; 23 August 1805 |
| 6 | Saturday; 24 August 1805 |
| 7 | Sunday; 25 August 1805 |
| 8 | Monday; 26 August 1805 |
| 9 | Tuesday; 27 August 1805 |
| 10 | Wednesday; 28 August 1805 |

décade 35
| 11 | Thursday; 29 August 1805 |
| 12 | Friday; 30 August 1805 |
| 13 | Saturday; 31 August 1805 |
| 14 | Sunday; 1 September 1805 |
| 15 | Monday; 2 September 1805 |
| 16 | Tuesday; 3 September 1805 |
| 17 | Wednesday; 4 September 1805 |
| 18 | Thursday; 5 September 1805 |
| 19 | Friday; 6 September 1805 |
| 20 | Saturday; 7 September 1805 |

décade 36
| 21 | Sunday; 8 September 1805 |
| 22 | Monday; 9 September 1805 |
| 23 | Tuesday; 10 September 1805 |
| 24 | Wednesday; 11 September 1805 |
| 25 | Thursday; 12 September 1805 |
| 26 | Friday; 13 September 1805 |
| 27 | Saturday; 14 September 1805 |
| 28 | Sunday; 15 September 1805 |
| 29 | Monday; 16 September 1805 |
| 30 | Tuesday; 17 September 1805 |

Decimal time – 10 h/day
Paris
1:94:56

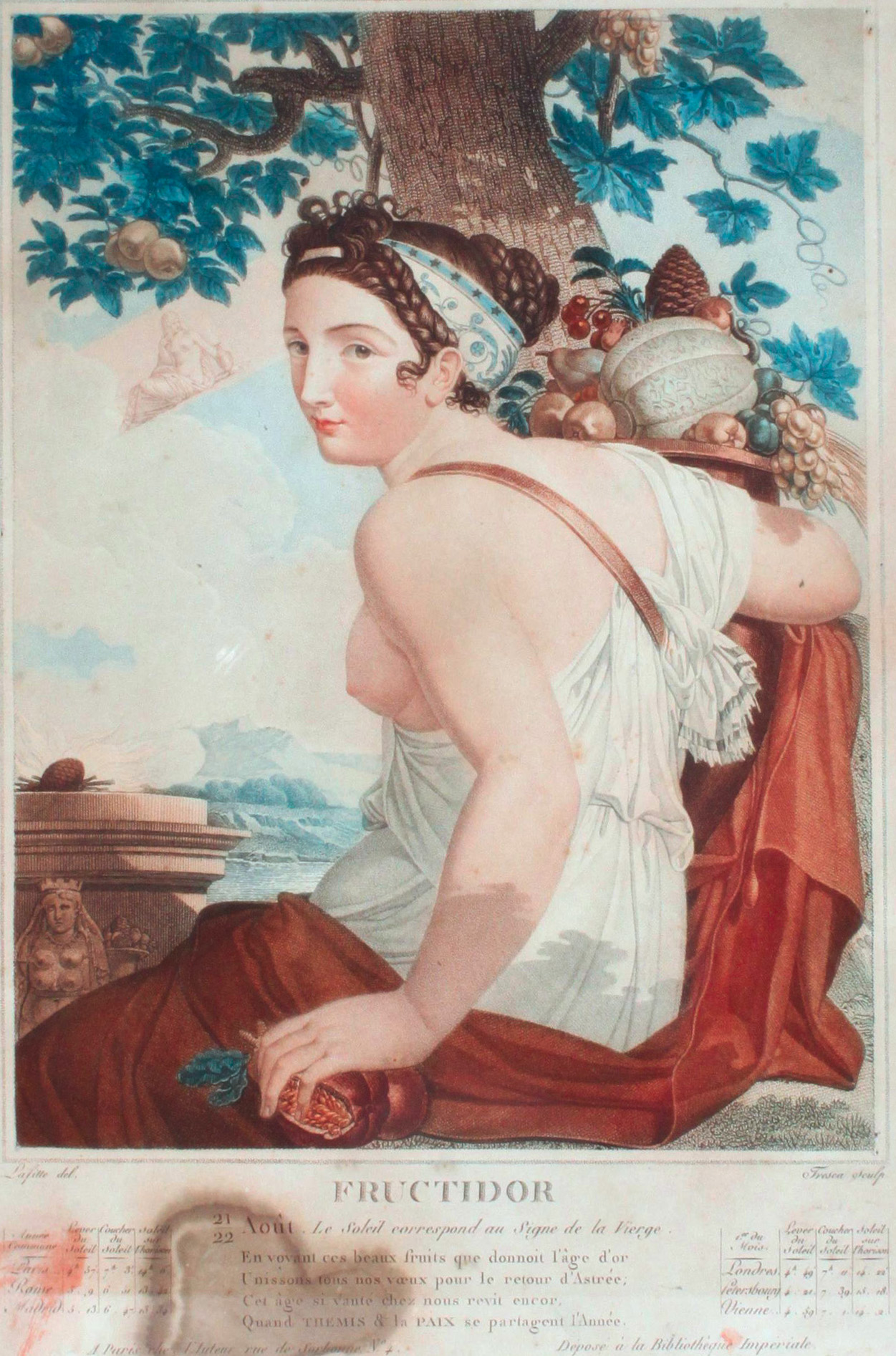
Fructidor

04:40:10
Time of day - 24 h/day
Greenwich

Year: 14
Month: Fructidor
Year: XIV

Day of the 10-day
week (décade)
Primidi
Duodi
Tridi
Quartidi
Quintidi
Sextidi
Septidi
Octidi
Nonidi
Décadi

décade 34
| 1 | Tuesday; 19 August 1806 |
| 2 | Wednesday; 20 August 1806 |
| 3 | Thursday; 21 August 1806 |
| 4 | Friday; 22 August 1806 |
| 5 | Saturday; 23 August 1806 |
| 6 | Sunday; 24 August 1806 |
| 7 | Monday; 25 August 1806 |
| 8 | Tuesday; 26 August 1806 |
| 9 | Wednesday; 27 August 1806 |
| 10 | Thursday; 28 August 1806 |

décade 35
| 11 | Friday; 29 August 1806 |
| 12 | Saturday; 30 August 1806 |
| 13 | Sunday; 31 August 1806 |
| 14 | Monday; 1 September 1806 |
| 15 | Tuesday; 2 September 1806 |
| 16 | Wednesday; 3 September 1806 |
| 17 | Thursday; 4 September 1806 |
| 18 | Friday; 5 September 1806 |
| 19 | Saturday; 6 September 1806 |
| 20 | Sunday; 7 September 1806 |

décade 36
| 21 | Monday; 8 September 1806 |
| 22 | Tuesday; 9 September 1806 |
| 23 | Wednesday; 10 September 1806 |
| 24 | Thursday; 11 September 1806 |
| 25 | Friday; 12 September 1806 |
| 26 | Saturday; 13 September 1806 |
| 27 | Sunday; 14 September 1806 |
| 28 | Monday; 15 September 1806 |
| 29 | Tuesday; 16 September 1806 |
| 30 | Wednesday; 17 September 1806 |

Decimal time – 10 h/day
Paris
1:94:56

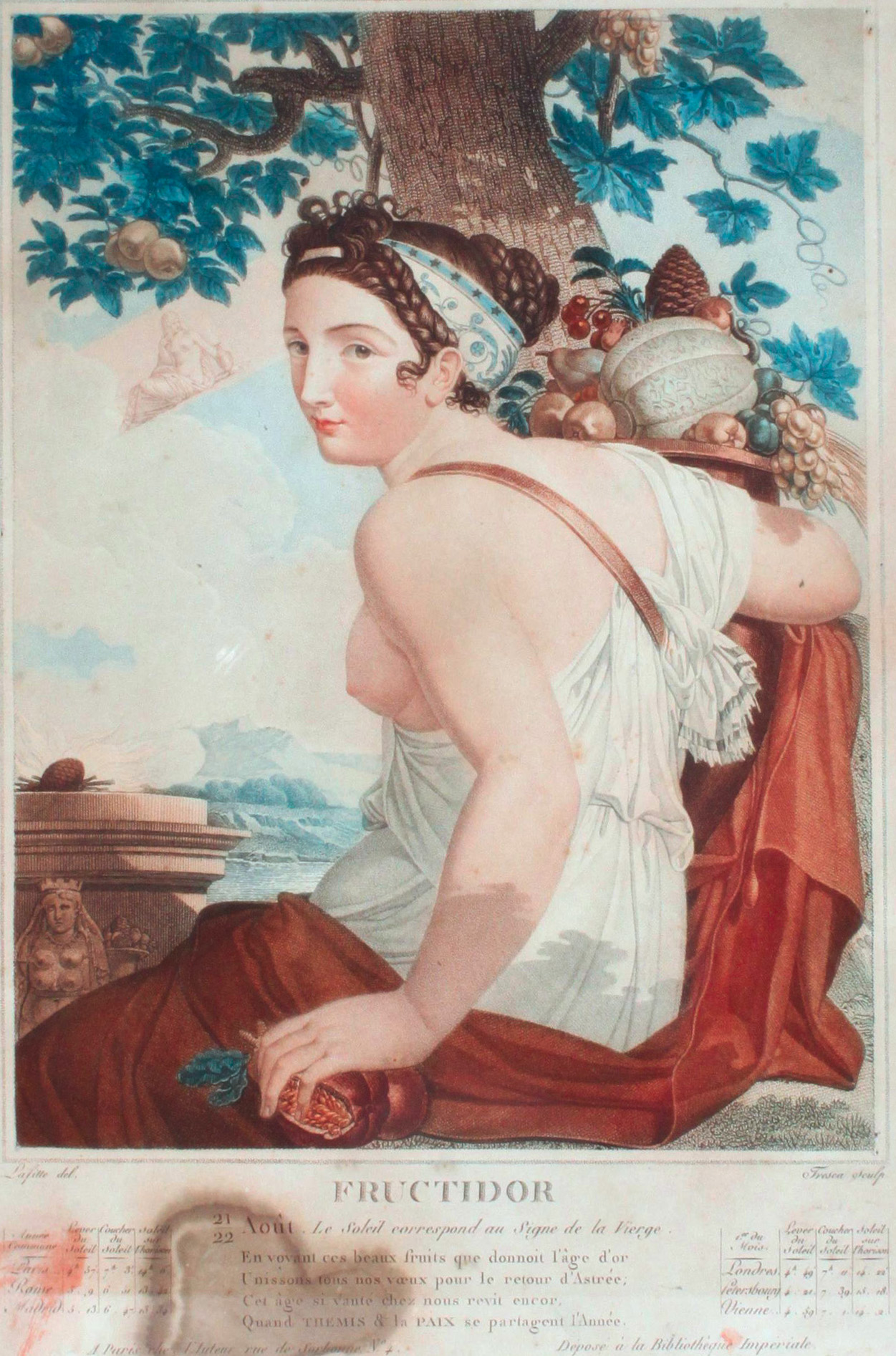
Fructidor

04:40:10
Time of day - 24 h/day
Greenwich

== Day name table ==
Like all French Republican months, Fructidor lasted thirty days and was divided into three weeks called decades (décades) which each lasted ten days. Within every decade, each day had the name of an agricultural plant, except the fifth - the Quintidi - which had the name of an animal, and the tenth - the Decadi - which had the name of an agricultural tool.

| | 1^{re} Décade | | 2^{e} Décade | | 3^{e} Décade |
| Primidi | 1. | Prune (Plum) | 11. | Pastèque (Watermelon) | 21. | Eglantier (Dog Rose) |
| Duodi | 2. | Millet (Millet) | 12. | Fenouil (Fennel) | 22. | Noisette (Hazelnut) |
| Tridi | 3. | Licoperde (Puffball) | 13. | Epine vinette (Barberry) | 23. | Houblon (Hops) |
| Quartidi | 4. | Escourgeon (Barleygrass) | 14. | Noix (Walnut) | 24. | Sorgho (Sorghum) |
| Quintidi | 5. | Saumon (Salmon) | 15. | Truite (Trout) | 25. | Écrevisse (Crawfish) |
| Sextidi | 6. | Tubéreuse (Tuberose) | 16. | Citron (Lemon) | 26. | Bigarade (Bitterorange) |
| Septidi | 7. | Sucrion (Barleygrass) | 17. | Cardière (Teasel) | 27. | Verge d'or (Golden Rod) |
| Octidi | 8. | Apocyn (Dogbane) | 18. | Nerprun (Buckthorn) | 28. | Maïs (Corn) |
| Nonidi | 9. | Réglisse (Licorice) | 19. | Tagette (African Marigold) | 29. | Marron (Horse Chestnut) |
| Decadi | 10. | Échelle (Ladder) | 20. | Hotte (Basket) | 30. | Panier (Basket) |

== Conversion table ==
Table for conversion between Republican and Gregorian Calendar
for the month "Fructidor"

I. / II. / III. / IV. / V. / VI. / VII.
| 1 | 2 | 3 | 4 | 5 | 6 | 7 | 8 | 9 | 10 | 11 | 12 | 13 | 14 | 15 | 16 | 17 | 18 | 19 | 20 | 21 | 22 | 23 | 24 | 25 | 26 | 27 | 28 | 29 | 30 |
| 18 | 19 | 20 | 21 | 22 | 23 | 24 | 25 | 26 | 27 | 28 | 29 | 30 | 31 | 1 | 2 | 3 | 4 | 5 | 6 | 7 | 8 | 9 | 10 | 11 | 12 | 13 | 14 | 15 | 16 |
August / 1793 / 1794 / 1795 / 1796 / 1797 / 1798 / 1799 / September

VIII. / IX. / X. / XI. / XII. / XIII.
| 1 | 2 | 3 | 4 | 5 | 6 | 7 | 8 | 9 | 10 | 11 | 12 | 13 | 14 | 15 | 16 | 17 | 18 | 19 | 20 | 21 | 22 | 23 | 24 | 25 | 26 | 27 | 28 | 29 | 30 |
| 19 | 20 | 21 | 22 | 23 | 24 | 25 | 26 | 27 | 28 | 29 | 30 | 31 | 1 | 2 | 3 | 4 | 5 | 6 | 7 | 8 | 9 | 10 | 11 | 12 | 13 | 14 | 15 | 16 | 17 |
August / 1800 / 1801 / 1802 / 1803 / 1804 / 1805 / September
