= Leodoro Piscicello =

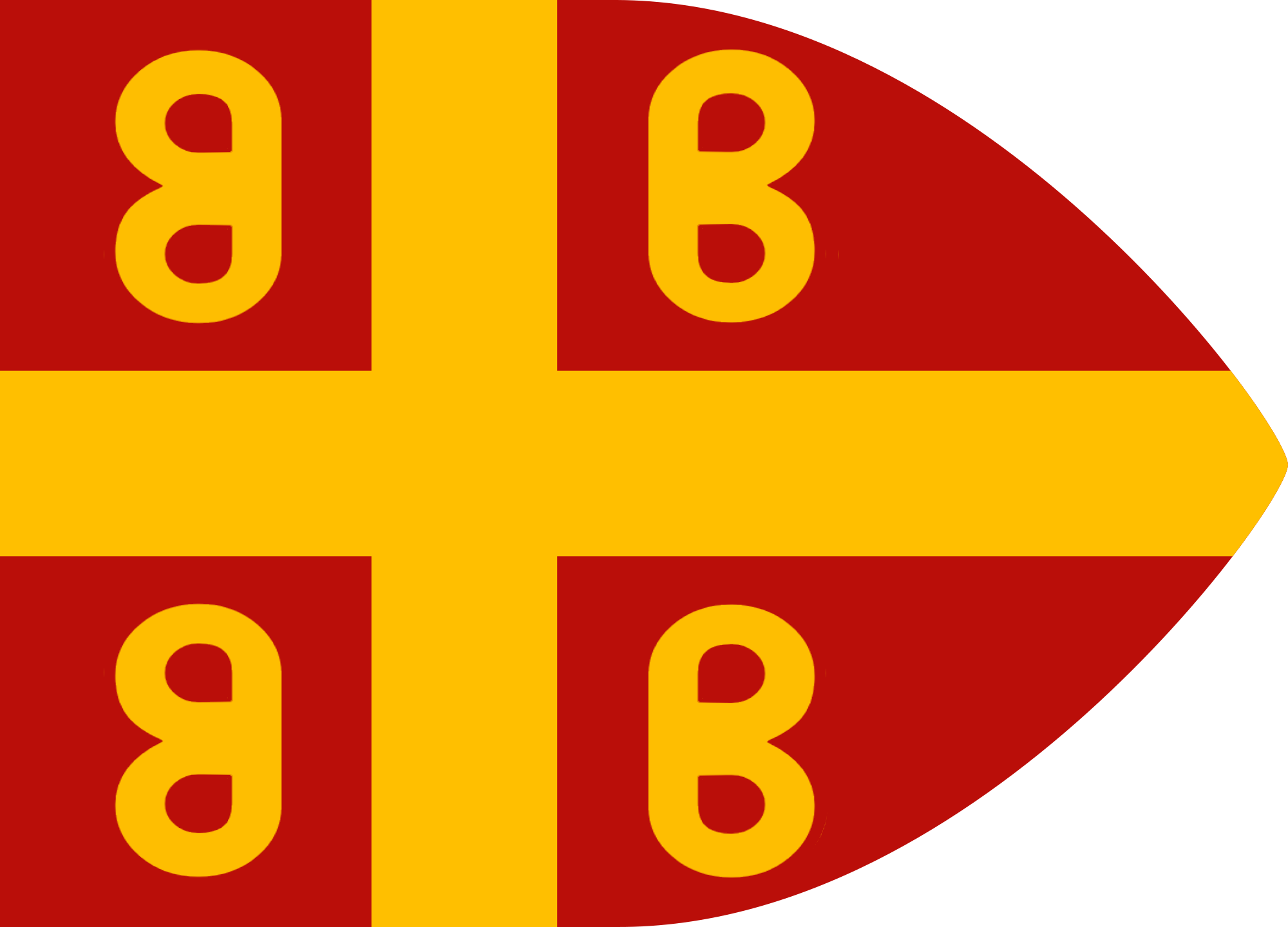

Leadership
- General: Southern Italy, in the Byzantine Empire

Related articles
- History: Leodorus Piscicellus (in Latin Liodorus Piscicellus) was first a soldier in the service of the Byzantine Empire, later due to his merits he became a general, a member of the schola, the direct bodyguard of the Byzantine emperor of the time, Basil II, called the Bulgarian, around the year 977. He was later sent by the same emperor to Southern Italy, to preside over the lands reconquered by the Empire, in the Duchy of Naples.
- Ranks: Soldier, General

Leodoro Piscicello (in Latin Liodorus Piscicellus) was first a valiant Byzantine soldier, then a leader during the regency of Basil II of Byzantium known as Basil the Bulgarian, who enlisted in the Byzantine imperial army. As a soldier of the Byzantine imperial ranks, he was then raised to the rank of élite knight in the so-called Scholae Palatinae and, subsequently, to that of general who was sent by Basil II to the Duchy of Naples.

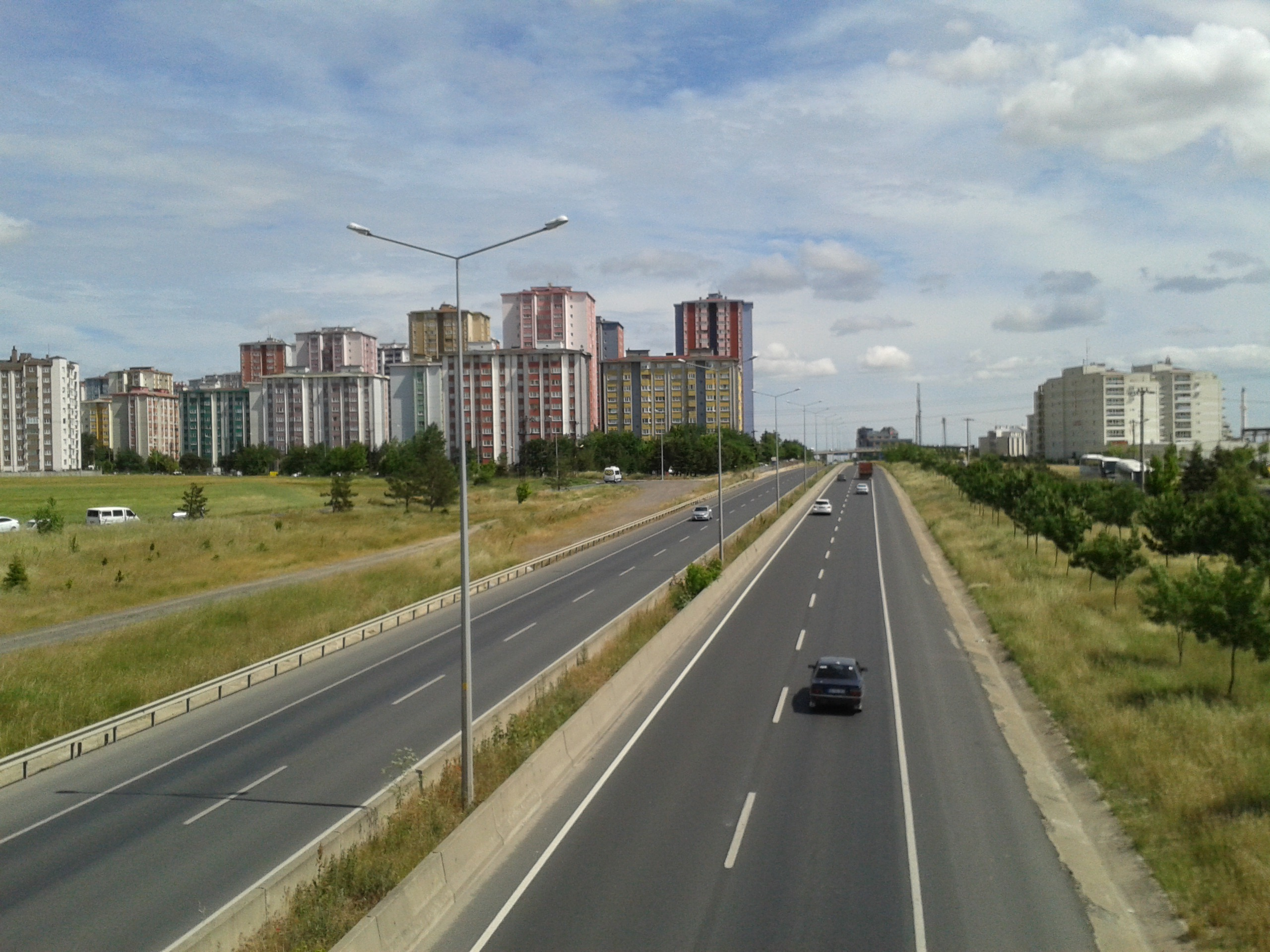
Partial view of the Real Estate Residences Towerblocks, the present city of Çorlu, located in Tekirdağ Province, Turkey.

== Biography ==
The first historical news dates back to the Byzantine age and precisely to the year 977 (976–1025), who, as mentioned above, was general of the Byzantine imperial ranks which at that time defended the remaining provinces of southern Italy, under imperial control.

It is remembered that, when Leodoro was elevated to the rank of knight, he became part, as a member, of the aforementioned schola palatina which was ab antiquo a cavalry unit of the army of the late Eastern Roman Empire in the service of the emperor which also constituted the so-called Palatine Guard. In fact, for high military merits, from Emperor Basil II himself, Leodoro obtained the highest rank of the Byzantine imperial army of general of the militias stationed in the Duchy of Naples in which, by captatio benevolentiae, he even entered the Neapolitan patriciate.

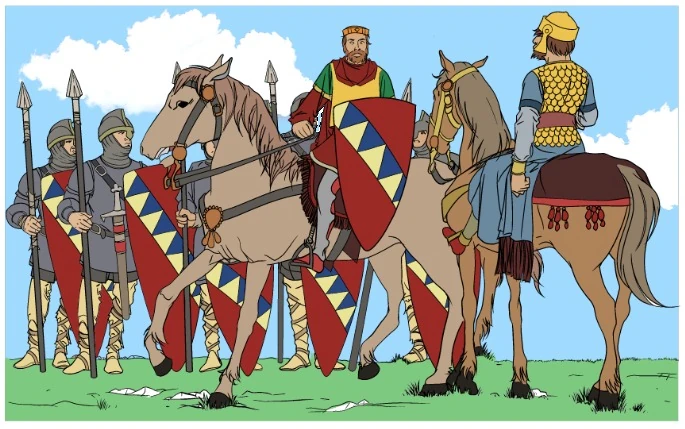
Leodoro Piscicello, with some armed soldiers of the Byzantine Empire, Thrace, Turkey, 10th century, in an artistic representation.

=== Ancestry ===
From Leodoro Piscicello descends the Piscicelli family also called Capece Piscicelli or Piscicello, formerly called Ollopesc. The Piscicelli family later merged into the De Vito Piscicelli family towards the end of the 17th century, the Piromallo Capece Piscicelli family in the 19th century and also many other branches, such as the De Vito Taeggi family and the De Vito Longobardi family. This family also intermarried with many other Neapolitan families over the centuries.

In turn, the Piscicelli family descends then the Zurolo family or Zurlo family, which is the same with the name changed in succession and the Aprano family, which takes its name from the homonymous Campanian village and from one of its ancient exponents, currently the Campanian town is called Casaluce, located in the province of Caserta.

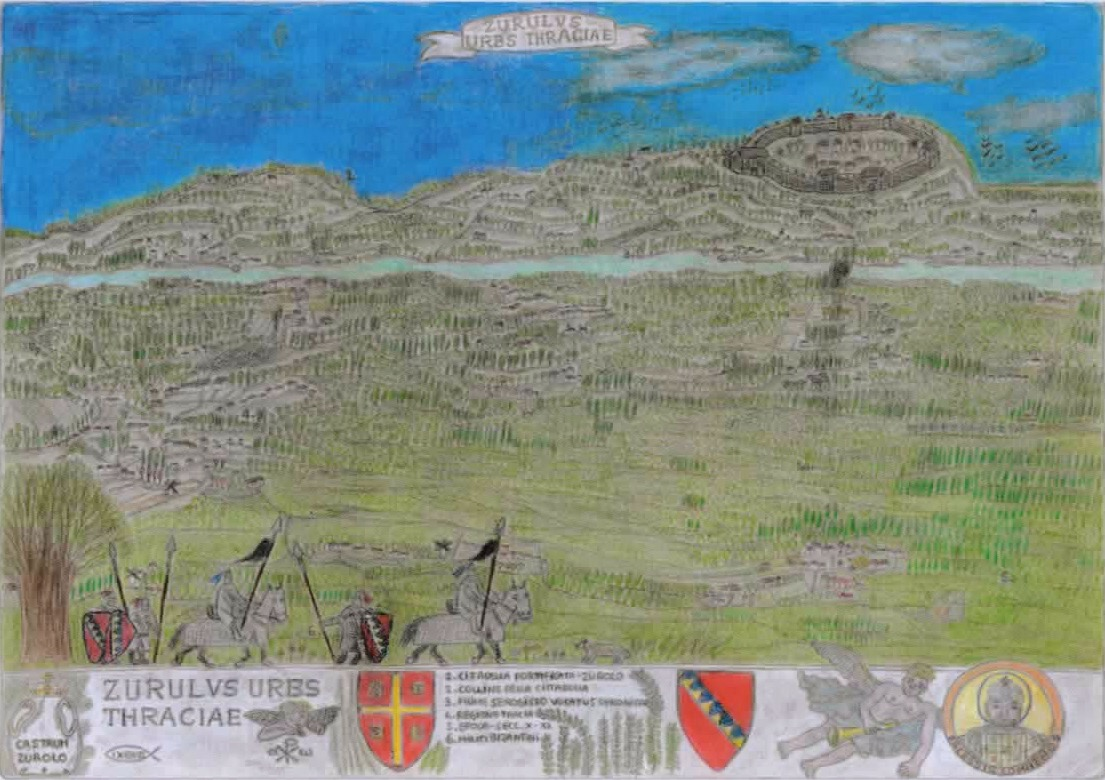
Hypothesis of perspective plan of the fortified city ZURULUS – URBS THRACIAE, 10th-11th centuries.

=== Syrallo-Tzurulos ===
In ancient times the city of Çorlu was called Syrallo-Tzurulos (in Italian Zurulo-Zurolo), it is a town located in the province of Tekirdağ, in Turkey. In Roman and Byzantine times, the city was called Tzouroulos or Syrallo, and then became Tiroloi (in Greek Τυρολόη) (see Tabula Peutingeriana). Furthermore, the spelling Zorolus is used for the Latinized form of the name of the episcopal seat identified with the current Çorlu in the list of titular sees of the Catholic Church. It is known that the Zurolo family derives from the Piscicelli family, its surname could derive precisely from that toponym.

== See also ==
- Byzantine army
- Byzantine Empire
- Basil II
- Captatio benevolentiae
- Comics
- Çorlu
- Duchy of Naples
- Floor plan
- House of Zurolo
- Latinisation of names
- Scholae Palatinae
- Tabula Peutingeriana
- Tekirdağ
- Tekirdağ Province
- Titular see
- Vico and Vicoletto of the Zuroli
- Toponymy
- Zurolo

== Bibliography ==
=== Historical sources ===
- Dante Alighieri (1303–1308). "XXIX" [XXIX]. Convivio [Convivio] (Manuscript) (in Italian). Vol. Treatise IV. Florence (FI).
- Antonio Fuggeri (1557). Nicetae Acominati, Choniatӕ, Magni Logothetӕ Secretorum, Inspectoris & Iudicis Veli, Prӕfecti sacri cubiculi [Nicetae Acominati, Choniata, Great Logothete of Secrets, Inspector and Judge of Veli, Prefect of the Sacred Chamber] (Paperback) (in Latin). no. 40 (years 1117–1203) and no. 45 (years 1117–1203). Basel (BS). pp. 248 and 309.
- Giovanni Antonio Summonte (1603). Historia della citta e regno di Napoli, Volume 2 [History of the city and kingdom of Naples, Volume 2] (Paperback) (in Italian). Vol. 2. Carlino. pp. 439 and following.
- Filiberto Campanile; et al. (Tarquinio Longo) (1610). "Dell'Insegne della Famiglia Piscicella" [Of the insignia of the Piscicella family]. In Tarquinio Longo's printing house (ed.). L'armi, ouero Insegne de' nobili; scritte dal signor Filiberto Campanile [The arms, or insignia of the nobles; written by Mr. Filiberto Campanile] (Paperback) (in Italian). pp. 196, 197, 198, 199, 200, 201, 202, 203, 204, 205, 206, 207, 208, 209, 210. 211, 212, 213, 214 and 215.
- Carlo De Lellis (1663). "DELLA FAMIGLIA PISCICELLO" [OF THE PISCICELLO FAMILY]. In in the printing house of Gio:Francesco Paci (ed.). Discorsi Delle Famiglie Nobili Del Regno di Napoli, volume 2 [Speeches of the Noble Families of the Kingdom of Naples, volume 2] (Paperback) (in Italian). Vol. 2. Naples (NA). p. 28.
- Filippo Ferrari; Michel Antoine Baudrand (1670). Michel Antoine Baudrand and Apud Franciscum Muguet (ed.). Lexicon Geographicum in quo Universi Orbis Urbes, Provinciӕ, Regna, Maria, & Flumina recensentur [A Geographical Lexicon in which the Cities, Provinces, Kingdoms, Marys, and Rivers of the World are listed] (Paperback) (in Latin). Apud Franciscum Muguet. pp. 351 and 352.
- Duke Giuseppe Reccho; Andrea ca. 1690 Magliar; et al. (Parrino, Domenico Antonio & Parrino, Niccolo) (1717). at Domenico-Antonio (ed.). Notizie di famiglie nobili, ed illustri della città, e Regno di Napoli. Descritte da don Giuseppe Reccho duca d'Acquadia, ... Libro libero nelle verità con la genealogia dell'illustre famiglia Latro [News of noble and illustrious families of the city, and the Kingdom of Naples. Described by Don Giuseppe Reccho, Duke of Acquadia, ... Free book in the truths with the genealogy of the illustrious Latro family] (Paperback) (in Italian). pp. 123 and 171.
- Don Biagio Aldimari (1691). "Della Famiglia Capece Piscicella., Della Famiglia Capece-Bozzuto." [Of the Capece Piscicella Family., Of the Capece-Bozzuto Family.]. In in Giacomo Raillard's printing house (ed.). Memorie historiche di diverse famiglie nobili [Historical memoirs of several noble families] (Paperback) (in Italian). Naples (NA): G. Raillard. pp. 120, 121 and 247.
- Don Biagio Aldimari; et al. (Giuseppe Roselli) (1691). "CON LA CASA CARAFA DELLA SPINA-Della Famiglia Capece Nido., FAMIGLIE IMPARENTATE-Della Famiglia Piscicella." [WITH THE CARAFA DELLA SPINA HOUSE-Of the Capece Nido Family., RELATED FAMILIES-Of the Piscicella Family.]. In in the printing house of Giuseppe Roselli (ed.). Historia genealogica della famiglia Carafa, scritta dal regio signore consigliere Don Biagio Aldimari [Genealogical history of the Carafa family, written by the royal lord councilor Don Biagio Aldimari] (Paperback) (in Italian). Vol. 3. Naples (NA). pp. 225 and 296.
- Count Berardo Candida-Gonzaga (1876). "ZURLO" [ZURLO]. In publisher of the printing house of Gaetano Curtis De Angelis and his son (ed.). Memorie delle famiglie nobili delle province meridionali d'Italia, 2 [Memoirs of the noble families of the southern provinces of Italy, 2] (Paperback) (in Italian). Vol. II. Naples (NA): G. De Angelis. pp. 219, 220, 221, 222, 223 and 224.
- Count Berardo Candida-Gonzaga (1879). "PISCICELLI" [PISCICELLI]. In publisher of the printing house of Gaetano Curtis De Angelis and his son (ed.). Memorie delle famiglie nobili delle province meridionali d'Italia, 5 [Memoirs of the noble families of the southern provinces of Italy, 5] (Paperback) (in Italian). Vol. V. Naples (NA): Stabbing. tip. of Cav. G. De Angelis and son. p. 143.
- Nicola Della Monica (2004) [October 1998]. "I Piscicelli" [The Piscicelli]. Le grandi famiglie di Napoli, le vicende, gli aneddoti, le curiosità mondane dei tanti illustri casati protagonisti della storia partenopea [The Great Families of Naples, The stories, anecdotes, and mundane curiosities of the many illustrious families who played a key role in Neapolitan history] (Paperback). Quest'Italia (in Italian) (2nd ed.). Rome (RM): Newton Compton Editori. p. 292. ISBN 88-8183-789-7.
- Carlo De Lellis; Elisabetta Scirocco; Michela Tarallo; et al. (Alessandro Grandolfo, Memofonte Foundation of Naples) (1689–2013). Napoli sacra dell'Engenio Caracciolo [Sacred Naples by Engenio Caracciolo] (PDF) (Paperback) (in Italian). Vol. I. Naples (NA)-Florence (FI). pp. 14, 15, 29, 30, 97, 98 and 99.
- Anna Komnene; et al. (Translator E. R. A. Sewter) (6 August 2009) [Circa 1148]. "Tzouroulos" [Tzouroulos]. The Alexiad [The Alexiad] (E-book). Penguin Books Limited. p. 242. ISBN 9780141904542.
- Gennaro Zurolo (2024). "I" [I]. Casata Zurolo. Origini e sviluppo di una famiglia feudale nel meridione d'Italia Casata [Zurolo House. Origins and development of a feudal family in southern Italy House] (Paperback) (in Italian). pp. 11, 12, 13, 14, 15 and 16.

=== Archival sources ===
- Royal Chancellery of the Kingdom of Naples (1987). I REGISTRI DELLA CANCELLERIA ANGIOINA: 1265–1434 [THE REGISTERS OF THE Angevin Chancellery: 1265–1434] (Ancient book). Vol. IV (XXXII ed.). L'Accademia. p. 2337.
- State Archives of Naples; Antonio Spinelli (1845). Antonio Spinelli (ed.). REGII NEAPOLITANI MONUMENTA ARCHIVUM, Vol. 1 [ARCHIVE OF THE MONUMENTS OF THE KING OF NAPLES, vol. 1] (Ancient book) (in Latin). Vol. I. (doc. VI, year 920). from the Royal Printing Office. pp. 63, 64 and 65.
- ANNUARIO DELLA NOBILTA' ITALIANA [YEARBOOK OF ITALIAN NOBILITY] (Ancient book) (in Italian). Vol. IV (XXXII ed.). Direction of the Heraldic Journal. 1879. p. 2337: Zurolo. A.P.F.Z.

=== Dictionaries and yearbook ===
- William Smith (1854). Dictionary of Greek and Roman Geography (Dictionary). ad vocem-Tzurulum/Syrallum/Zurulum.
- Gerhard Rohlfs (1982). Dizionario storico dei cognomi salentini (Terra d'Otranto) [Historical dictionary of Salento surnames (Terra d'Otranto)] (Dictionary) (in Italian). Congedo. p. 276. ISBN 9788877862389.
- Michele Francipane (November 2005). "SECONDA PARTE, TERZA PARTE" [SECOND PART, THIRD PART]. Dizionario ragionato dei cognomi italiani [Reasoned dictionary of Italian surnames] (Dictionary) (in Italian). Milan (MI): Rizzoli Universal Library. pp. 743 and 744. ISBN 9788817007641.
- Staff of Vatican Secretariat of State (2013) (2013). Annuario pontificio (2013) [Pontifical Yearbook (2013)] (Yearbook) (in Italian). Vatican City (VA): Vatican Publishing House. p. 1013. ISBN 9788820990701.
