= House of Piscicelli =

Piscicelli
- Parent house: Capece
- Country: Byzantine Empire; Kingdom of Sicily; Kingdom of Naples; Kingdom of the Two Sicilies
- Founded: 8th century
- Titles: Duke of Capracotta (1674); Baron of Colle d'Anchise, Pietracupa, Torricella; Neapolitan patrician
- Cadet branches: Zurolo

The Piscicelli family (sometimes referred to as Capece Piscicelli) was a noble Italian family, originating from Naples, which played a prominent political, military, and ecclesiastical role in the history of the Kingdom of Naples and became extinct in the main line, merging into the de Vito Piscicelli and Piromallo Capece Piscicelli branches.

Enrolled in the Seats of Nido and Capuana, the family was registered in 1800 in the Libro d'Oro of Neapolitan Nobility.

== History ==
=== Origins and early period ===
The earliest records of the family date back to the period of the Byzantine Duchy (8th–11th century), when it is attested among the Neapolitan magnate families. Its first documented member is Leodoro, who in 977 served as a cavalry general under the Emperor Basil II (976–1025).

The House of Piscicelli is historically linked to the Capece lineage, along with the Minutolo, Tomacelli, Latro, and Caputo families. According to tradition, following disputes with the Capece regarding the right to bear the same coat of arms (the lion rampant), the Piscicelli modified their arms by adopting a bend cuneate Or and Azure on a field Gules.

=== Norman, Swabian, and Angevin periods ===
With the establishment of Norman power under the Hautevilles, during the reigns of Roger II and William II the Good, the family consolidated its presence in military and diplomatic service, also providing advisers to the Crown and prelates to the Kingdom.

During the Swabian period and the Angevin and Aragonese eras, the Piscicelli reached the pinnacle of their political and economic influence. In 1283, Riccardo Piscicelli was appointed justiciar of Principato Citra by King Charles I of Anjou. In 1414, Berardo Piscicelli held the office of Archbishop of Palermo and was Grand Chancellor of the Kingdom of Sicily, while in 1457 Rinaldo Piscicelli was created a cardinal by Pope Callixtus III and appointed Archbishop of Naples.

From the Piscicelli derived the Zurlo and Aprano families, who resided in the Capece district located in the Seat of Capuana and bore the same insignia without the label. The progenitor of the Zurlo family was Giovanni Piscicelli, called Zurlo (d. 30 September 1381), son of Berardo Piscicelli and Giovanna Caracciolo.

=== Early modern period and extinction ===
During Spanish rule, several members took part in the imperial campaigns of Charles V in Italy and Hungary, as well as in the wars against the Barbary corsairs and in Flanders. In 1674, Alfonso Piscicelli acquired the title of Duke of Capracotta.

The main house became extinct in the male line:

- At the end of the 17th century, following the marriage of Caterina Piscicelli to Andrea de Vito, the de Vito Piscicelli line was formed, inheriting part of the assets and the surname.
- In the 19th century, through the marriage between Maria Luisa Piscicelli (the last of the branch of the Dukes of Capracotta) and Giacomo Piromallo, the lineage and titles merged into the Piromallo Capece Piscicelli.

== Fiefs and titles ==
The family held over 40 fiefs, distributed mainly across Campania, Abruzzo, and Molise.

=== Main titles ===
- Duke of Capracotta (created in 1674 for Alfonso Piscicelli)
- Baron of Colle d'Anchise, Pietracupa, Torricella, Castel di Sangro, Carovilli, Salcito, Roccapipirozzi.

== Notable members ==
- Leodoro Piscicelli (10th century): cavalry general in the service of the Byzantine Emperor Basil II.
- Riccardo Piscicelli (13th century): leader of the Neapolitan Guelph faction and justiciar of Principato Citra under Charles I of Anjou.
- Berardo Piscicelli (d. 1425): politician and prelate, Archbishop of Palermo and Grand Chancellor of the Kingdom of Sicily.
- Giovanni Piscicelli (d. 1455): Archbishop of Salerno and adviser to King Alfonso V of Aragon.
- Rinaldo Piscicelli (1415–1457): elevated to Cardinal in 1457 by Pope Callixtus III, he was Archbishop of Naples.
- Andrea Piscicelli (16th century): captain of arms and viceroy on behalf of the Spanish Crown in various provinces of the Kingdom.
- Alfonso Piscicelli (17th century): 1st Duke of Capracotta from 1674.

== Places of worship and burial ==
- Basilica of San Domenico Maggiore (Naples): the family owned the renowned Piscicelli Chapel (or Capece Piscicelli Chapel), rich in Renaissance funerary monuments and sculptures.
- San Giovanni a Carbonara (Naples): the family contributed to the decoration and patronage within the complex.

== Bibliography ==
- Alighieri, Dante (2000) [1303-1308]. Convivio. Florence.
- Campanile, Filiberto (1680). Dell'armi, overo insegne dei nobili (3rd ed.). Naples: Stamperia Antonio Gramignani.
- Candida Gonzaga, Berardo (1875). Memorie delle famiglie nobili delle province meridionali d'Italia. Vol. s. 5 and 6. Bologna: Arnaldo Forni Editore.
- De Lellis, Carlo (1663). Discorsi delle famiglie nobili del Regno di Napoli. Vol. 2. Naples: Giovanni Francesco Paci.
- della Monica, Nicola (1998). Le grandi famiglie di Napoli (1st ed.). Rome: Newton Compton. ISBN 88-8183-789-7.
- Mazzella, Scipione (1601). Descrittione del Regno di Napoli. Naples: Giovanni Battista Cappello.
- Schipa, Michelangelo (1925). Nobili e popolani in Napoli nel Medioevo in rapporto all'amministrazione municipale. Vol. 83 (series 7, vol. 3), no. 1 (313). Archivio Storico Italiano.
- Summonte, Giovanni Antonio (1640). Dell'historia della città, e Regno di Napoli. Vol. 3. Naples: Francesco Savio.

== See also ==
- Capece
- Zurlo
- Zurolo
- Maurizio de Vito Piscicelli
- Dukes of Capracotta
