= House of Zurolo =

Zurolo
- Noble house
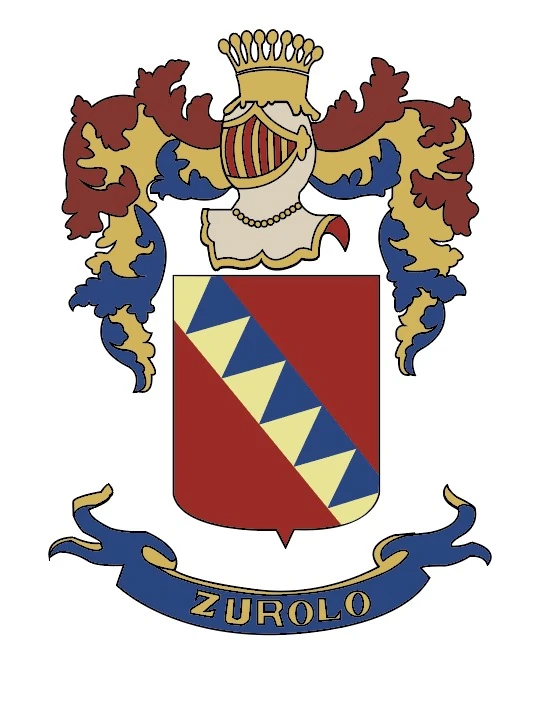
- Coat of Arms: Gules, a bar cuneate Or and Azure. Ditto: Gules, a bar cuneate Or and Azure; on the shield (Samnite), a helmet Argent with a closed visor set at three-quarters, with an equestrian gorget necklace, adorned with flourishes (Gules, Or, and Azure), a corded band in band, and a counts' coronet Or (set with jewels) surmounted by sixteen pearls, supported by points, nine of which are visible; at the point, the inscription ZUROLO on a bifid band fluttering Azure in capital letters Sable and Or.
- Parent family: House of Piscicelli, House of Capece
- Country: Byzantine Empire; Duchy of Naples; Kingdom of Sicily; Kingdom of Naples; Kingdom of the Two Sicilies; Kingdom of Italy; Italy
- Origin: Byzantine Empire, via Leodoro Piscicello (Duchy of Naples)
- Founded: 977; 1049 years ago
- Founder: Leodoro Piscicello, Enrico Piscicelli Zurolo
- Historic seat: Angri; Casaluce; Castellammare di Stabia; Naples
- Titles: Viceroy of the Principality, Abruzzo and Terra Giordana; Prince; Duke of Nocera; Duke of San Marco; Count of Lecce; Count of Sant'Angelo and Potenza; Count of Sant'Angelo; Count of Montoro and Nocera; Count of Montoro; Count of Nusco; Count of Guardialombarda; Count of Bemergenza or Brienza; Baron of Oppido; Baron of Pietragalla and Casalaspro; Baron of Cancellara; Baron of Acquavella; Lord; Neapolitan Patrician (Napolitano); Patrician of Giovinazzo; Nobleman of Giovinazzo; Nobleman (Nob.); Knight of Malta or Jerusalem and Commander; Knight of Constantine; Knight of the Crown of Italy; Sir; Magnificent; Honorable (Hon.)
- Traditions: Catholicism
- Cadet branches: Capece-Zurlo; Zurla; Zurlo of Crotone

The House of Zurolo, also historicized over the centuries as Zuroli, Zurla, Zurlo, Zullo, Capece Zur(o)lo, or Zurolo d'Aprano / Apriano; the latter referring to Aprano, a frazione of Casaluce in Caserta which was ab antiquo one of their main fiefdoms, is an ancient noble Neapolitan family, descended from the Byzantine House of Piscicello, and feudal house of the Kingdom of Naples. Renowned since the 13th century, the family achieved significant prominence during the reign (1343–1382) of Queen Joanna I of Anjou.

== History ==
The earliest records of the family date back to the Byzantine Duchy period (8th–11th centuries), when it is attested among the Neapolitan magnate families. Its first documented exponent is Leodoro, who in 977 served as a cavalry general under Emperor Basil II (976–1025).

Subsequently, with the establishment of Normann rule under the reigns of Roger II (1130–1154) and William the Good (1166–1189), the family solidified its presence through military engagement in combating Saracen offensives, diplomatic roles regarding relations with the papacy, institutional involvement as royal advisors, and holding the office of archbishop.

Its political influence was reaffirmed even after the accession of the Hohenstaufen (Swabian) dynasty under Emperor Henry VI (1195–1197).

The family reached its peak prominence during the Angevin and Aragonese eras (1266–1495), when several of its members held high-ranking military, social, and politico-institutional positions. Throughout this entire timeframe, numerous members of the Piscicelli family maintained close personal relationships with the monarchs, served on the Royal Council, and held territorial commands as well as ecclesiastical administrative offices.

=== 10th–11th centuries ===
The house originated as a cadet branch of the centuries-old Neapolitan lineage of the Piscicelli (or Piscicello), of Byzantine origin. The lineage was anciently called Ollopisce, referring to a small fish depicted on shields and coats of arms (cf. ichthys, an ancient Christian symbol).

Historical records trace the family's origins to 977 with Liodorus Piscicellus (Leodoro Piscicello). He served initially as a soldier defending the borders of remaining Byzantine provinces in southern Italy, later becoming a Byzantine general and cavalry commander under Emperor Basil II ("the Bulgaroctonos") in the Duchy of Naples. Accounts describe him as belonging to the Latins or Greek military nobility who arrived in Italy by imperial order.

=== 12th century ===
Direct descendants of Leodoro Piscicello in the 11th and 12th centuries included prominent military and administrative figures:

- Leonis Piscicellus: Knight who fought against the Saracens under Roger the Norman (1063).
- Cesario Piscicellus: Knight who also served under Roger the Norman against Muslim forces (1063).
- Guidotus Zurulus: Knight who participated in the first Genoese naval expedition to the Levant during the First Crusade (1097–1099).
- Rolandus Zurulus: Imperial judge (1163) and consul who managed regency affairs; he was later dispatched to France regarding military and colonial matters of the Third Crusade (1189–1192).

Despite variations in surname across primary archival records, epigraphs, and armorials over the centuries, heraldic sources recognize these figures as belonging to the same root lineage.

=== 13th–14th centuries ===
From the 14th century onward, double surnames became common following the reorganization of Neapolitan city seats ordered by King Robert of Anjou. Upon joining the seggio (city seat) of Capuana, the family prefixed Piscicelli to their surname, reflecting late medieval consortium practices. Early Neapolitan heraldic traditions (such as those cited by Elio Marchese) often considered the Piscicelli, Zurlo, and Capece families to descend from a single common stock within the Capuana seat, while later historians like Scipione Ammirato noted that Neapolitan noble houses frequently split into autonomous lineages derived from physical traits or personal nicknames ("motti e da giuocchi"). Through this process, the Zurlo, originating directly from Giovanni Piscicelli, known as "Zurlo" (d. 1381), gradually separated from the parent Piscicelli family while maintaining shared ties within the Capuana consorteria. The house held nobility in Naples (seats of Capuana and Nido), Bitonto, and Giovinazzo.

Their original Neapolitan residence stood in the ancient Forcella quarter. A 14th/15th-century family palace with a Gothic portal remains on Via dei Tribunali, giving name to Vico and Vicoletto of Zuroli near Pio Monte della Misericordia.

Notable members from this period include:

- Enrico (Arrigo) Piscicelli Zurolo (1235–1305): Knight, diplomat, and advisor to King Charles II of Anjou, who was baron and feudal lord of Aprano. He married Laudamia d'Aquino.
- Giovanni (Giovannello) Piscicello Zurolo (1256–1320): Son of Enrico; advisor to Charles II, Count of Lecce, and Viceroy governing the Principality of Citra (formerly vicar of Walter VI of Brienne). He married Letizia Caracciolo.
- Berardo (Bernardo) Zurolo (d. c. 1289/1330): Son of Giovanni; Neapolitan patrician and feudal lord of Aprano. He married Giovanna Caracciolo.
- Gurello Zurlo (d. 1380): Logothete and grand prothonotary under Queen Joanna I. A staunch supporter of Avignon Antipope Clement VII during the Western Schism, his property was confiscated by Pope Urban VI.
- Giovanni Zurolo (1315–1381): Son of Berardo; buried in the Cathedral of Naples (in the Basilica di Santa Restituta). Lord of Angri, Sant'Angelo dei Lombardi, Aprano, Andretta, Fossacesia, San Marzano sul Sarno, Startia (in Montoro), Campomarano (Civitacampomarano), and Torricella. In 1378, Queen Joanna I issued a decree allowing Giovanni to pass his feuds to his second-marriage sons, excluding the orphan daughters of his deceased eldest son, Nicola Antonio. He married secondly Beatrice Pontiaco, who was widely benefited by the Durazzo rulers: in 1386, Margaret of Durazzo granted her a pension on the Cosenza silk tax; in 1390, King Ladislaus confirmed her purchase of the Barony of Salice in Terra d'Otranto for 7,000 ducats (later exchanged for San Felice); and in 1391, Ladislaus granted her the market tax (gabella della platea Pizzaguto) of Angri.
- Cicuzzo Zurlo: In June 1382, alongside his son Marino and brothers Giacomo and Francesco, he joined Louis I of Anjou at Maddaloni to support his claim to the Neapolitan throne, marking the family's expanding military role during the Angevin-Durazzo succession wars.
- Nicola Antonio Zurolo (d. 1388): Brother of Giovanni; lord of Fossacesia, married Gaspara Spinelli.
- Giacomo Pietro Zurolo (d. 1391): Brother of Giovanni; feudal lord of Montefalcone nel Sannio.
- Martuccio (Martusciello) Zurolo: Chamberlain and castellan of the Aragonese castle of Reggio Calabria in 1392.
- Marino Zurolo: Neapolitan patrician.

=== 15th century ===
During the 15th century, members of the family held major administrative, ecclesiastical, and military roles:

- Arrigo (Enrico) Zurolo (d. 1407): Feudal lord of San Silvestro, Claruncolo, Montefalcone nel Sannio, Montemiletto, Cellamare, and Pressano; castellan of the Palazzo de' Mori in Otranto and Cellamare Castle. Servant and seneschal of the royal household under King Ladislaus.
- Ligorio Zurolo: Grand Seneschal of the Kingdom.
- Bernardo Zurolo (d. 1415): 1st Count of Montoro (purchased in 1405), 1st Count of Nusco (acquired in 1413), seneschal of the royal household (1400), royal chamberlain and marshal (1405), and later grand prothonotary apostolic and logothete of the Kingdom (succeeding Gorello Origlia in 1412). Married Antonella Caracciolo.
- Giovanni II Zurolo (Zurlo) (1382–1440): Son of Bernardo; Count and lord of Angri and Roccapiemonte. In 1421, he defended Angri against the forces of Braccio da Montone. In May 1423, he fought alongside Muzio Attendolo Sforza at the Battle of Casanova to protect Queen Joanna II from Alfonso V of Aragon. With 12,000 ducats collected from ransoming Catalan prisoners, he purchased the city and comital title of Potenza. In 1424, while campaigning with Sforza in Abruzzo, he entered peace negotiations with Braccio da Montone after Sforza's death in the Pescara River, but was assassinated in a conspiracy at Ortona. In 1436, he founded the convent and church of the Ss. Annunziata of Angri. Married Dalfina Caracciolo; their daughter Antonella married Francesco Caracciolo (Petricone) in 1449.
- Francesco Zurolo (d. 1449): Son of Bernardo; 2nd Count of Montoro and Nocera dei Pagani, lord of Solofra, San Marzano, and Montella (purchased in 1444). Succeeded his father as grand prothonotary and was present at the coronation of Queen Joanna II in 1419. In July 1417, he occupied Solofra Castle following the death of the Filangieri heirs, sparking a siege by Filippo Filangieri "il Prete" until royal delegates intervened. In 1438, he surrendered Nocera Castle to Alfonso V of Aragon in exchange for being re-enfeoffed as an Aragonese vassal, later serving as grand seneschal. Married Margherita Sanseverino.
- Salvatore (Rossillo) Zurolo: 3rd Count of Nusco, lord of Bagnoli and Cassano Irpino (acquired in 1444 from Alfonso V), former grand seneschal. Married Mariella Caracciolo del Sole.
- Salvatore Zurolo (1349–1404): 1st Count of Sant'Angelo dei Lombardi and Potenza, royal soldier under Ladislaus I, royal advisor, and grand seneschal. In July 1399, King Ladislaus appointed him as one of four royal envoys (fideles) to negotiate the surrender of Naples from Louis II of Anjou at the Church of San Pietro Martire. Married Margherita d'Eboli.
- Giovanni (Giovannello) Zurolo (1370–1424): Son of Salvatore; 2nd Count of Sant'Angelo dei Lombardi and Potenza. Enfeoffed in 1413 by King Ladislaus I, serving as royal advisor and commander in the relief of L'Aquila. Married Elisabetta Taurisano (daughter of the lord of Toritto).
- Salvatore II Zurolo: Son of Giovanni II; had his extensive feuds confiscated by Queen Joanna II in 1426 following a dispute over Guardialombarda with the Prince of Taranto. His brother Nicola Antonio Zurolo maintained the title of Count of Sant'Angelo until formally ceding it in 1464 to Marino Caracciolo (having married Caracciolo's daughter Caterina).
- Giacomo Zurolo (d. 1453): Known as del Principe, son of Salvatore; lord of Casalaspro (an abandoned village in Muro Lucano), castellan of Ariano Irpino, and chamberlain to Queen Joanna II. On 10–12 November 1442, King Alfonso V granted him and his brother Marino a royal indult, confirming their feuds of Oppido Lucano, Pietragalla, Cancellara, and Grottole with full civil and criminal jurisdiction (merum et mixtum imperium) and power of the sword (potestas gladii). A condottiero commanding lance contingents, he married Francesca Brancaccio; issue included Caterina, Beatrice, Pietro, Ettore, and Francesco.
- Francesco Zurolo (d. 1480): Son of Giacomo; Baron of Oppido Lucano, lord of Pietragalla and Casalaspro. Married Cassandra Caracciolo (issue: Lucrezia, Caterina, Ughetta). He died defending Otranto during the Ottoman siege of 1480. With his daughter Caterina (who married Mario Orsini, Count of Pacentro), he founded the Convent of Santa Maria del Gesù (Sant'Antonio) in Oppido Lucano.
- Enrico (Arrigo) Zurolo (1410–1478): Son of Giovanni II; Neapolitan patrician, feudal lord of Moliterno and Montefalcone di Val Fortore. Established the family's prominent branch in Giovinazzo. Married Brigida Miroballo.

=== 16th century ===
- Francesco Zurolo (1447–1505): Son of Enrico and Brigida Miroballo. A knight and captain, he served as judge representing the Italian faction in the historic Challenge of Barletta (February 13, 1503). Buried in the Co-Cathedral of Giovinazzo, he married Geronima de Ritiis. Issue:
  1. Enrico Zurolo (1479–1542): Knight, married Giovannella Vulpano.
  2. Nicola Antonio Zurolo (1490–1550): Married into the Mansola family.
- Francesco III Zurolo: Count of Montoro, son of Bernardo II. As a prominent member of the Capece consortium within the city seat (seggio) of Capuana, he was elected in March 1494 in the Minutolo Chapel of the Cathedral of Naples as syndic and procurator to swear the oath of allegiance to King Alfonso II of Naples on behalf of the Neapolitan nobility. He supported Charles VIII during the Italian Wars; his castle at Nocera was besieged and captured by Ferrante II in 1495.
- Giovanni Berardino Zurolo: Son of Francesco III; fought in the Spanish ranks at the Battle of Cerignola (1503). However, following his support for the failed French campaign of Marshal Lautrec in 1528, his feuds and comital titles of Montoro were permanently confiscated by the Crown.
- Bartolomeo Pietro (Pietro) Zurolo: Brother of Francesco (1447–1505); military captain and Mayor of the Nobles of Giovinazzo (1499). Married Romana Turcolo.
- Lorenzo (Renzo) Zurolo (d. 1512): Brother of Francesco; lieutenant under Don Innico Lopez and war captain for the seat of Capuana. Married Giacoma Orsini.
- Giacomo Zurolo (1485–1539): Son of Francesco (1447–1505); infantry captain and protontino (royal naval commander) of Giovinazzo. Married Francesca de Planca (daughter of Leone de Planca). Issue:
  1. Francesco Geronimo Zurolo (1523–1575): Infantry captain in Terra d'Otranto and protector of the Monastery of San Giovanni Battista in Giovinazzo. Married Lucrezia Morola.
  2. Geronimo Zurolo (b. 1533): Deacon of the vicar forane of Giovinazzo.
  3. Nicola Antonio (Colantonio) Zurolo (1535–1587): Jurist (doctor in utroque iure) and patrician of Giovinazzo. Married Minerva Morola. Issue included Giovanni Giacomo (b. 1569), Francesco (b. 1571), Giulia (b. 1575, Benedictine Abbess), and Beatrice (b. 1577).

On 1 January 1584, the establishment of the Monte dei Capece institutionalized the historic affiliation among the noble families of the Capuana seat. Under the Monte's statutes, participating branches of the Zurlo and Piscicelli families prefixed the surname Capece to their own (giving rise to the Capece Zurlo line) and quartered their heraldic coats of arms with the crowned golden lion of the House of Capece to secure eligibility for the institution's financial and nobility benefits.

=== 17th–18th centuries ===
- Francesco (Capece) Zurolo (c. 1571 – 1628): Son of Colantonio; provost of Giovinazzo. In 1589, he successfully re-aggregated the family to the seat of Capuana by right of succession, briefly prefixing Capece to the surname. Married Donna Lucrezia Chiurlia. Issue included:
  1. Giacomo Carlo Zurolo (1601–1656): Doctor of laws (doctor in utroque iure), buried in Santa Caterina a Formiello in Naples. Married Donna Antonia Chiurlia. Their line gave rise to Francesco (Mayor of Giovinazzo in 1685), Lucrezia Maria, Giovanni Lorenzo (m. Duchess Anna Maria Anfora), and Giuseppe Antonio (b. 1629), progenitor of the Baranello branch that produced Count Giuseppe Zurlo (1757–1828), Minister of the Interior for the Kingdom of the Two Sicilies.
  2. Fra' Giovanni Capece Zurolo (1602–1673): Knight of Malta (admitted 1613), serving as Bailiff and Admiral of the Sovereign Military Order of Malta (1670–1671).
- Giovanni Battista Maria Zurolo (1549–1590): Son of Francesco Geronimo and Lucrezia Morola. Lord in Larino; buried in the Cathedral of Castellammare di Stabia. Married Donna Elisabetta Donnarumma (Lady of Franche in Pimonte). From his son Agostino (b. 1576, benefactor of the Confraternity of the Holy Body of Christ) and Maria Dianora Donnarumma (m. 1608) descends the modern documented branch of the family represented by lawyer and historian Dr. Gennaro Zurolo (b. 1959; son of Carmine Zurolo [1929–2000] and Rita Tavella [1934–1984]), who married Dr. Maria Giovanna Apuzzo (b. 1962), father of Enrico (b. 2009).

== Branches of the Zurolo family ==
Major cadet branches of the Zurolo family documented across Italy include:

1. Capece Zurlo (also Zurlo or Zurolo): Primary Campanian line.
2. Zurla of Crema: Cremonese branch that has borne the name since around c. 1400.
3. Zurlo of Crotone: Calabrian branch bearing the name since c. 1400.
4. Zurolo of Baranello: Comital branch in Molise.
5. Zurolo of Castellammare di Stabia: Main documented modern Neapolitan line.
6. Zurolo of Solofra: Feudal branch holding Montoro and Solofra.

=== Zurlo of Crotone ===
The Zurlo of Crotone branch established its presence in Calabria in the 15th century. According to the genealogical tables of Serra di Gerace, this cadet line originates from the primary Neapolitan stock through the descendants of Salvatore Zurlo (d. 1404).

The earliest feudal record of this line dates to 1492, when Antonio Zurlo of Naples held the fief of Paganò (with San Stefano) in the territory of Santa Severina, as subsequently recorded in the 1504 reintegration act of Duke Andrea Carafa.

Titles and Heraldry

The branch held the titles of Patrizi di Crotone (Patricians of Crotone) and Baroni sul cognome (Barons on the surname). Their coat of arms is blazoned as:

- Azure, a bend indented argent accompanied by three stars or (two in chief, one in base) (d'azzurro, alla banda dentata d'argento, accompagnata da tre stelle d'oro, due in capo ed una in punta).

Civic Integration and Orders

In 1735, Don Pietro Zurlo and his brothers were formally admitted as noble patricians to the civic seat of Crotone, the Sedile di San Dionigi. Proofs of nobility (Processo nobiliare) were successfully submitted to the Sovereign Military Order of Malta for family members including Gaetano and Antonio Zurlo.

Notable Members

- Gio. Cesare Zurlo (d. 1630): Family patriarch whose estate passed to his son, the Reverend Horatio Zurlo, and his children Gio. Domenico, Francesca, and Lucrezia.
- Gio. Domenico Zurlo (17th century): Physician (dottore fisico) active during the plague outbreaks in mid-17th century Crotone.
- Giovanni Domenico Zurlo (18th century): Treasurer of the Cathedral of Crotone (Tesoriere della Cattedrale).

Residence and Holdings

The family's urban seat was Palazzo Zurlo, situated in the parish of San Pietro in Crotone. Mid-18th-century tax records (catasto onciario) record extensive urban and agricultural assets, including four storehouses (magazzeni) outside the city gates near the Church of SS. Annunziata, livestock holdings, and revenues from fiefs such as Apriglianello.

== Armorial ==
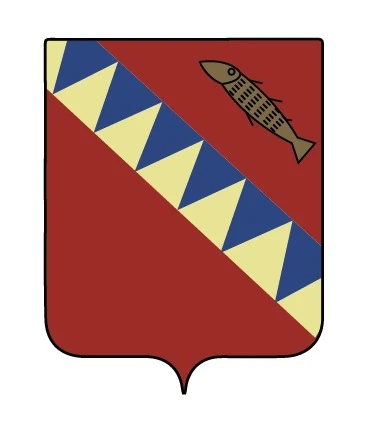
Coat of arms attributed to the noble Piscicello-Zurolo family.

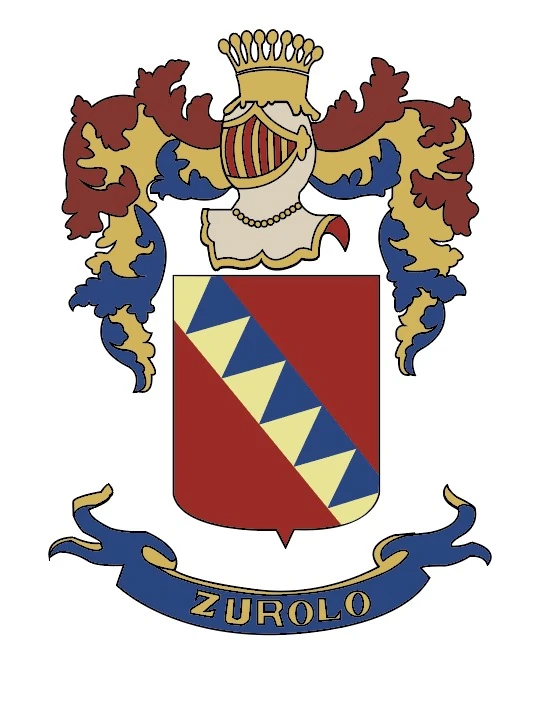
Official coat of arms of the noble House of Zurolo / Zurlo (Neapolitan branch).

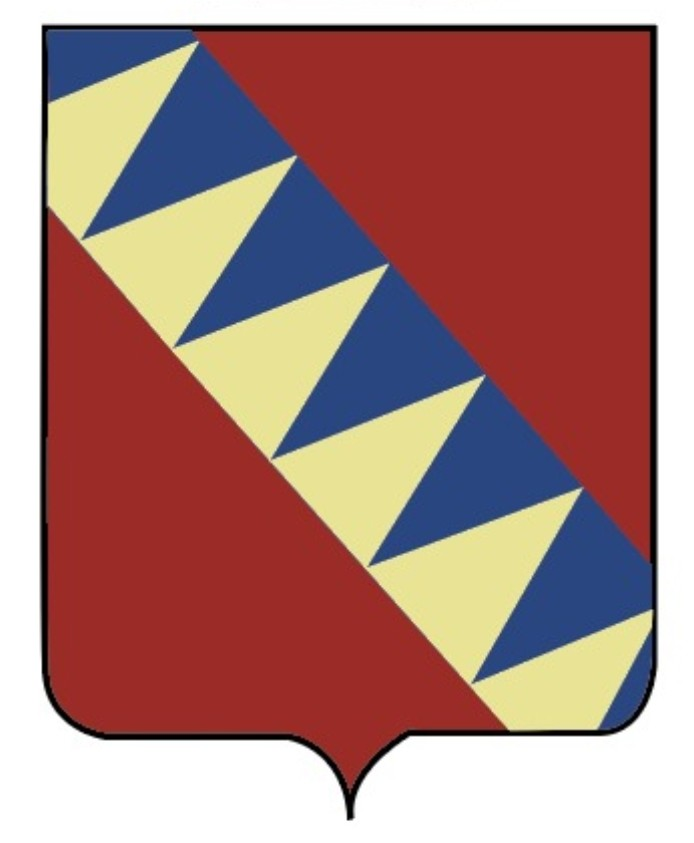
Coat of arms attributed to the Zurolo / Zurlo family.

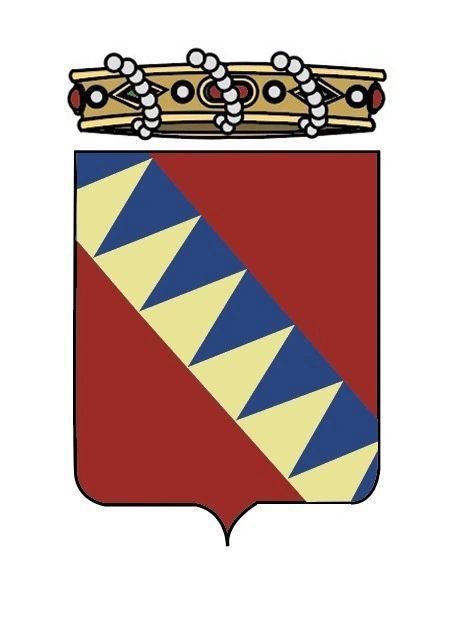
Baronial coat of arms attributed to the Zurolo family.

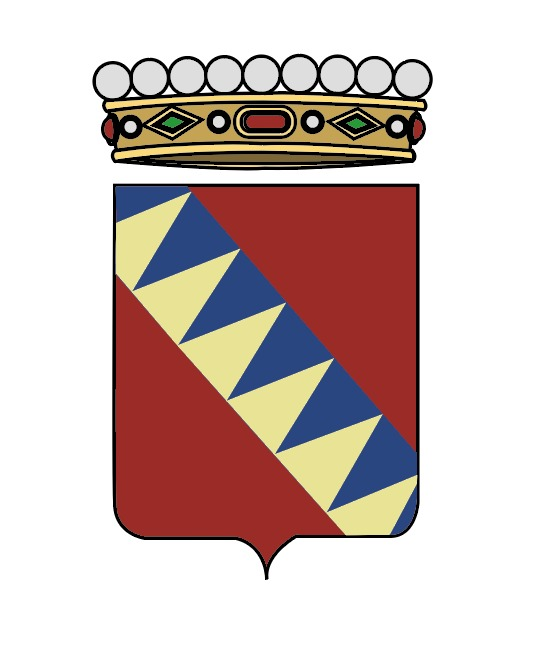
Comital coat of arms attributed to the Zurolo family.

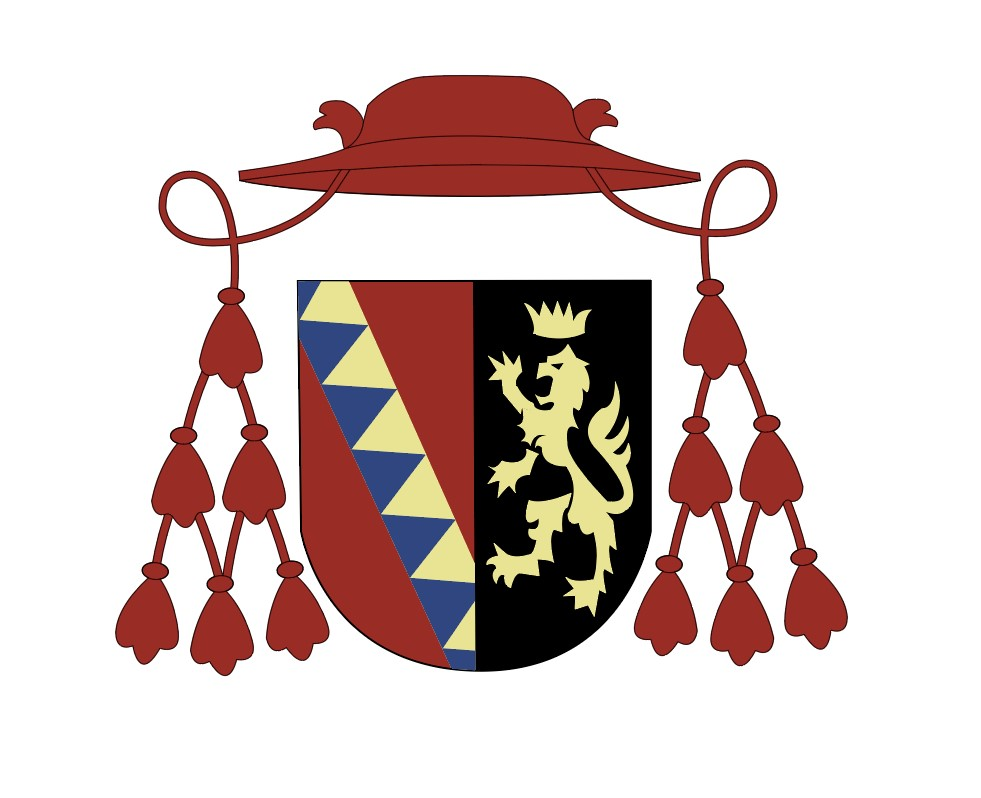
Cardinalatial coat of arms of Giuseppe Maria Capece Zurlo.

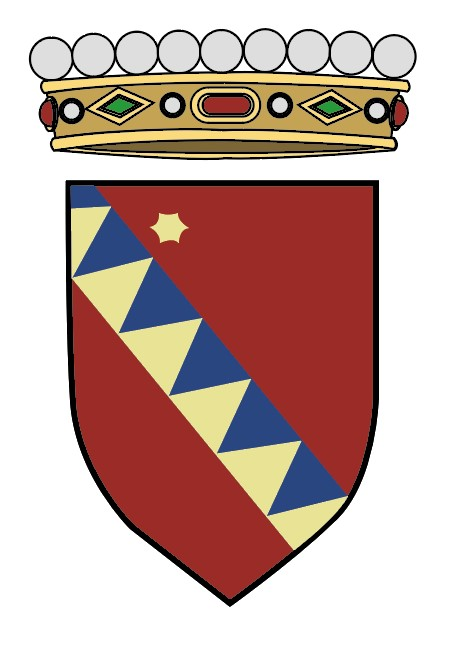
Comital coat of arms of the Zurolo family (Baranello branch).

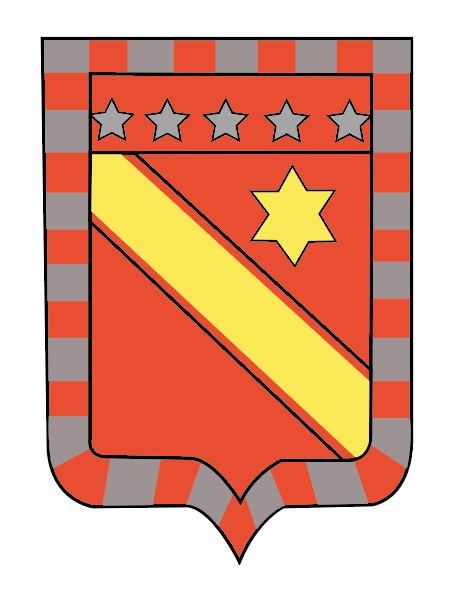
Coat of arms of the Baranello branch, granted with the comital title by royal decree of Joachim Murat on 25 March 1811.

Comital coat of arms attributed to the noble Zurla family (Crema branch).

Ducal coat of arms attributed to the noble Zurla family (branch from Crema).

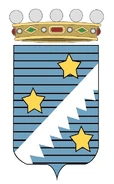
Baronial coat of arms of the Zurlo family (Crotone branch).

== Prominent figures ==
In chronological order:

- Giovanni (Giovannello) Zurolo (d. 1388 in Naples): Count and feudal lord of Angri, Sant'Angelo, Aprano, Andretta, Fossacesia, San Marzano, Startia, Civitacampomarano, and Torricella. Buried in the Cathedral of Naples (Chapel of Santa Restituta).
- Giovanni Zurlo (1382–1440): Count and defender of Angri during the 1421 siege by Braccio da Montone; founder of the Church and Convent of SS. Annunziata in Angri (1436).
- Francesco Zurlo (d. 1480): Baron of Oppido, commander of infantry who was killed defending Otranto against Ottoman Vizier Ahmed Pasha in 1480; co-founder of the Convent of Santa Maria del Gesù in Oppido Lucano.
- Fra' Giovanni Capece Zurolo (1602–1673): Knight of Malta (SMOM), Bailiff and Admiral of the Order of St. John of Jerusalem (1670–1671).
- Giuseppe Zurlo (1757–1828): Count of Baranello and Minister of the Interior of the Kingdom of the Two Sicilies.
- Gennaro Zurolo (b. 1959 in Castellammare di Stabia): Nobleman (mf.), Knight of the Sovereign Military Order of Malta (SMOM), Knight of the Order of Merit of the Italian Republic (OMRI, conferred by President Sergio Mattarella in 2022), honorary magistrate at the Court of Naples, historian, member of the Neapolitan Society of National History (SNSP), author of Signa et Insignia (2014) and Casata Zurolo (2024), and honorary citizen of Angri.

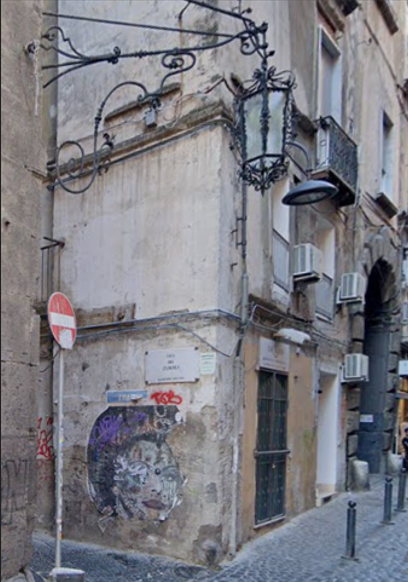
Via dei Tribunali, view (from left), Palazzo Zuroli seu Zurolo, century XIV-XV. The palace was the family's main residence in southern Italy.

== Zurolo possessions ==
Among the civil and religious buildings that housed the Zurolo family (main branch) in Italy are the following (in alphabetical order):

- Church of the Most Holy Annunciation, in Angri;
- Convent of Santa Maria del Gesù, in Oppido Lucano;
- Zuroli seu Zurolo palace, in Naples.

== See also ==
- Andretta
- Angri
- Armorials
- Aversa
- Bagnoli
- Baranello
- Baron
- Basil II
- Bitonto
- Braccio da Montone
- Byzantine Empire
- Capece
- Casaluce
- Cassano Irpino
- Castellammare di Stabia
- Cathedral of Naples
- Challenge of Barletta
- Cellamare
- Churches in Naples
- Civitacampomarano
- Co-Cathedral of Santa Maria Assunta (Giovinazzo)
- Condottiero
- Convent of Santa Maria del Gesù (Oppido Lucano)
- Çorlu
- Count
- Charles II of Naples
- Crema
- Crusades
- Dynasty
- Duchy of Naples
- Eboli
- Family
- Feoffment
- Fief
- First Crusade
- Fossacesia
- France
- Francesco Zurolo
- Genoese navy
- Giovanni Zurolo
- Giuseppe Zurlo
- Giovinazzo
- Greek
- Guagnano
- House of Zurla
- Ichthys
- Joanna I of Anjou
- King
- Kingdom of Naples
- Kingdom of the Two Sicilies
- Knight
- Ladislaus I of Hungary
- L'Aquila
- Lecce
- Lettere
- Lione
- Logothete
- Middle Ages
- Nobility
- Moliterno
- Montefalcone nel Sannio
- Montefalcone di Val Fortore
- Montemiletto
- Montoro
- Montoro Superiore
- Muro Lucano
- Muslims
- Naples
- Nocera dei Pagani
- Nusco
- Latins
- Leodoro Piscicello
- Oppido Lucano
- Otranto
- Ottoman conquest of Otranto
- Overlord
- Pio Monte della Misericordia
- Pimonte
- Potenza
- Province of Caserta
- Prince
- Reggio Calabria
- Robert of Anjou
- Roccapiemonte
- Roger the Norman
- Salice Salentino
- San Marzano sul Sarno
- Sant'Angelo dei Lombardi
- Santa Restituita
- Solofra
- Sovereign Military Order of Malta
- Terra di Otranto
- Third Crusade
- Torricella
- Toritto
- Vico, and Vicoletto, of Zuroli
- Village
- Walter VI of Brienne
- Zurla (family)
- Zurolo

== Bibliography ==
=== Historical sources ===
- Francesco Giannone (1905). Memorie storiche, statuti e consuetudini dell'antica terra di Oppido in Basilicata [Historical Memoirs, Statutes, and Customs of the Ancient Land of Oppido in Basilicata] (Paperback) (in Italian). Palermo (PA): Fratelli Marsala. pp. 35, 36, 37, 38, 39, 40, 41, 43 and 55.
- Francesco Scandone (1911). L'alta valle del Calore. Montella antica e medio-evale (sino alla fondazione del regno di Sicilia), e le sue costituzioni municipali [The upper Calore Valley. Ancient and medieval Montella (until the founding of the Kingdom of Sicily), and its municipal constitutions.] (Paperback) (in Italian). Naples (NA): Detken and Rocholl (Palermo, A. Trimarchi). pp. 119 and subsequent.
- Carlo Padiglione (1914). Trenta centurie di armi gentilizie, raccolte e descritte [Thirty centuries of noble arms, collected and described] (Paperback) (in Italian). Naples (NA): Casa editrice Ferd. Bideri. p. 371.
- Saverio Daconto (1926). Saggio storico sull'antica città di Giovinazzo [Historical essay on the ancient city of Giovinazzo] (Paperback) (in Italian). Giovinazzo (BA): N. De Bari Typography. pp. XXXIX, 74, 86, 88 and 137.
- Amilcare Foscarini; Pietro De Leo (1927). Armerista e notiziario delle famiglie nobili, notabili e feudatarie di Terra d'Otranto (oggi provincie di Lecce, di Brindisi e di Taranto) estinte e viventi, con tavole genealogiche [Armarium and news of the noble, notable, and feudal families of Terra d'Otranto (now the provinces of Lecce, Brindisi, and Taranto), both living and extinct, with genealogical tables] (Paperback) (in Italian). Lecce (LE): Forni. p. 301.
- Amilcare Foscarini (1971). Amerista e notiziario delle famiglie nobili, notabili e feudatarie di Terra d'Otranto [Amerista and newsletter of the noble, notable and feudal families of Terra d'Otranto] (Paperback) (in French). Lecce (LC). p. 301.
- Nicola Di Guglielmo (1988). Storia, di Francesco Scandone "Atti delle Prime Giornate volume III, Andrettesi", Andretta 18–19 agosto 1986 [History, by Francesco Scandone "Proceedings of the First Days volume III, Andrettesi", Andretta 18–19 August 1986] (Paperback) (in Italian). Naples (NA): Pro-Loco Andretta Association. pp. 33, 34 and 35.
- Michele Bonserio (1999). Le pergamene della chiesa dello Spirito Santo di Giovinazzo, regestario [The parchments of the Church of the Holy Spirit in Giovinazzo, register] (Paperback) (in Italian). Giovinazzo (BA): Centro Studi Meridionali. pp. 209 and later.
- Alfredo Franco; Felice Marciano; Gennaro Zurolo; Vincenzo Amorosi (February 2003). La Disfida 1503–2003 [The Challenge 1503–2003] (Paperback) (in Italian). Poggiomarino (NA): Centro Studi Storici Historicarum. pp. 29, 30, 31, 32, 33 and 37.
- Gennaro Zurolo; et al. (edited by the Municipality of Angri) (December 2008). Le strade di Angri, la toponomastica, i personaggi, le storie [The streets of Angri, the toponymy, the characters, the stories] (Paperback) (in Italian). Foreword by Dr. Mayor Giampaolo Mazzola. Angri (SA): EDIZIONI COMUNE ANGRI 2008. pp. 36—42 and 302—310.
- Saverio Daconto (2011). Giovinazzo nel 1860. Studio storico da documenti inediti [Giovinazzo in 1860. Historical study from unpublished documents] (Paperback) (in Italian). Giovinazzo (BA): La Matrice. pp. 74, 86, 87, 88 and 137. ISBN 9788895614205.
- Gennaro Zurolo (2014). Signa et Insignia, fonti per la Storia del Notariato a Castellammare di Stabia (Secoli XIII-XIX) [Signa et Insignia, sources for the History of the Notary Office in Castellammare di Stabia (13th–19th centuries)] (Paperback) (in Italian). Castellammare di Stabia (NA). p. 257.
- Gennaro Zurolo (2017). La Città nobile di Giovinazzo e Frà Giovanni Capece Zurlo seu Zurolo, Ammiraglio e Balì dei Cavalieri di Malta nel XVII secolo (alla luce di documenti inediti) [The noble city of Giovinazzo and Brother Giovanni Capece Zurlo seu Zurolo, Admiral and Bailiff of the Knights of Malta in the 17th century (in light of unpublished documents)] (in Italian). Rome (RM). p. 143.
- Gennaro Zurolo (2024). Casata Zurolo. Origini e sviluppo di una famiglia feudale del Meridione d'Italia [The Zurolo family. Origins and development of a feudal family from Southern Italy.] (in Italian).

=== Archival sources ===
- Antonio Fuggeri (1557). Nicetae Acominati, Choniatae, Magni Lagothetoe Secretorum, Inspectoris & Iudicis Veli, Proefecti sacri cubiculis [Nicetas Acominatus, Choniatas, Great Lagothetoes of the Secrets, Inspector and Judge of the Veil, Prefect of the Sacred Chambers] (Ancient book) (in Latin). Basel (BS). pp. 24 and 309.
- Scipione Mazzella (1601). At the request of G.-B. Cappello (ed.). Descrittione Del Regno di Napoli [Description of the Kingdom of Naples] (Ancient book) (in Italian). p. 650.
- Giovanni Antonio Summonte (1603). Historia della Città e del Regno di Napoli, tomo 2 [History of the City and Kingdom of Naples, Volume 2] (Ancient book) (in Italian). Vol. 2 (2nd ed.). Naples (NA). pp. 439 and later.
- Scipione Ametrano (1603). at Costantino Vitale (ed.). Della Famiglia Capece, opera intitolata a Federigo Tommacello,...per Scipione Ametrano [By the Capece family, a work dedicated to Federigo Tommacello,...for Scipione Ametrano] (Ancient book) (in Italian). Naples (NA). pp. 10, 11, 106 and 107.
- Filiberto Campanile; et al. (Tarquinio Longo) (1610). Tarquinio Longo's printing house (ed.). L'Armi, ovvero Insegne de' Nobili [The Arms, or Insignia of the Nobles] (Ancient book) (in Italian). Naples (NA). pp. 196 and subsequent.
- Luigi Volpicella (1648). Patriziati e Nobiltà civiche nel già Reame di Napoli [Patriciates and Civic Nobilities in the former Kingdom of Naples] (Ancient book) (in Italian). Vol. II and IV. Naples (NA). pp. 29/LXXIII and 100/XXXIII.
- Carlo De Lellis (1663). Discorsi Delle Famiglie Nobili Del Regno di Napoli-volume 2 [Speeches of the Noble Families of the Kingdom of Naples – Volume 2] (in Italian). Vol. 2. Naples (NA). p. 28.
- Biagio Aldimari; Giacomo Del Po; Andrea Magliar (1691). Memorie historiche di diverse famiglie nobili [Historical memoirs of various noble families] (Ancient book) (in Italian). Naples (NA). pp. 120, 121 and 506.
- Ottavio Beltrano; et al. (Cesare D' Engenio Caracciolo) (1671). Descrittione del Regno di Napoli diviso in dodeci provincie, nella quale con brevità si tratta della fedelissima città di Napoli, e delle cose più notabili di essa, e delle città, e terre più illustri del regno ... [Description of the Kingdom of Naples divided into twelve provinces, in which the most faithful city of Naples is briefly discussed, along with its most notable features, and the most illustrious cities and lands of the kingdom...] (Ancient book) (in Italian). Naples (NA). p. 22.
- Carlo De Lellis (1689). Napoli sacra dell'Engenio Caracciolo I [Sacred Naples by Engenio Caracciolo I] (Ancient book) (in Italian). Naples (NA). pp. 14, 15, 29, 30, 97, 98 and 99.
- Ludovico Paglia; Luigi Sagarriga; Gaetano Frammarini; et al. (Carlo Toijis) (1700). for Carlo Troijs (ed.). Istorie della Città di Giovenazzo [History of the City of Giovenazzo] (Ancient book) (in Italian). Naples (NA). pp. 103, 144, 166, 249, 255, 258, 261, 271, 277 and 356.
- Duke Giuseppe Recco d'Acquadia; et al. (Andrea Magliar) (1717). from Domenico-Antonio and Nicola Parrino (ed.). Notizie di famiglie nobili e illustri della Città e Regno di Napoli [News of noble and illustrious families of the City and Kingdom of Naples] (Ancient book) (in Italian). Naples (NA). pp. 123 and 171.
- Gaetano Montefuscoli (1780). "IV". Imprese ovvero Stemmi delle Famiglie italiane [Enterprises or Coats of Arms of Italian Families] (Ancient book) (in Italian). Naples (NA). p. 100.
- Catello Parisi (1842). "MATRIMONI NOBILI" [NOBLE MARRIAGES]. Cenno storico-descrittivo della città di Castellammare di Stabia contenente la sua indicazione, le notizie dell'antica e nuova Stabia, il suo stato attuale ed un'appendice di utili nozioni che la risguardano per Catello Parisi [Historical and descriptive outline of the city of Castellammare di Stabia, containing its name, information on ancient and new Stabia, its current state, and an appendix of useful information about it by Catello Parisi] (Ancient book) (in Italian). Florence (FI). p. 99.
- Regii Neapolitani Archivi Monumenta [Royal Neapolitan Archives Monuments] (Ancient book) (in Latin). Vol. I. 1845.
- Count Bernardo Candida-Gonzaga (1875). St. typ. of Cav. G. de Angelis and son (ed.). Memorie delle famiglie nobili delle province meridionali d'Italia, Volume 2 [Memoirs of the Noble Families of the Southern Provinces of Italy, Volume 2] (Ancient book) (in Italian). Vol. 2. Naples (NA). pp. 219 and later.
- Lord Bisanzio Lupis (1880). "In primis quelli stati catastati." [First of all those registered in the land registry.]. In Giuseppe De Ninno (ed.). Cronache di Giovinazzo [Chronicles of Giovinazzo] (Ancient book) (in Italian). Production Director V. Vecchi. Giovinazzo (BA): Printing of the Royal Hospice Vittorio Emanuele, directed by V. Vecchi, Chronicles of Giovinazzo. pp. 15 and 16.
- AA. VV. (1889). Aldo of Crollalanza; Giovanni Battista of Crollalanza; Goffredo of Crollalanza (eds.). Annuario della nobiltà italiana [Yearbook of the Italian Nobility] (Ancient book) (in Italian). at the direction of the Heraldic Journal and the Yearbook of the Italian Nobility. p. 2337.
- Gaetano Caporale (1890). Memorie storico-diplomatiche della città di Acerra e dei conti che la tennero in feudo, corredate di riscontri tra la storia civile e la feudale della Campanìa [Historical-diplomatic memoirs of the city of Acerra and of the counts who held it as a fief, accompanied by comparisons between the civil and feudal history of Campania] (Ancient book) (in Italian). Naples (NA). pp. 274 and 368.
- Giuseppe De Ninno; et al. (Giuseppe De Ninno.) (1890). Memorie Storiche degli Uomini Illustri della Città di Giovinazzo [Historical Memoirs of the Illustrious Men of the City of Giovinazzo] (Ancient book) (in Italian). Bari (BA): F. Pansini Printing House. pp. 15, 16, 88, 89, 101 and 102.

=== Blasonaries and dictionaries ===
- Giovan Battista di Crollalanza (1965) [1886]. "ZUZ" [ZUZ]. Dizionario storico-blasonico delle famiglie nobili e notabili italiane estinte e fiorenti [Historical and blazonry dictionary of noble and notable Italian families, both extinct and flourishing.] (Dictionary) (in Italian). Vol. I. Pisa (PI): A. Forni, At the direction of the heraldic newspaper. p. 129.
- Francesco Benvenuti Sforza (1888). Dizionario biografico cremasco [Crema Biographical Dictionary] (Dictionary) (in Italian). Bologna (BO): Forni editore. pp. 318, 319, 321, 322, 323, 325, 328, 336, 338, 339, 340, 341, 342, 345, 347, 349, 356, 552, 554, X.
- Gerhard Rohlfs (1982). Dizionario storico dei cognomi salentini (Terra d'Otranto) [Historical Dictionary of Salento Surnames (Terra d'Otranto)] (Dictionary) (in Italian). Naples (NA): Congedo. p. 276. ISBN 978-88-7786-238-9.
- Roberto Borio Di Tigliole; Carlo Maria Del Grande (1999) [1999]. Blasonario cremasco. Nobili e Notabili Famiglie della Città di Crema [Coat of Arms of Crema. Noble and Notable Families of the City of Crema.] (Blasonary) (in Italian). Milan (MI): Zanetti.

=== Catalogues ===
- Gennaro Zurolo; Lorena Scarpato; Vincenzo Spera; et al. (Gianluigi Trignano, Felice Marciano) (2013). Collezione Zurolo – Patrimonio Storico Archeologico della Campania (D.M. – Decreto del 20 aprile 1998, Ministero per i Beni Culturali e Ambientali) [Zurolo Collection – Historical Archaeological Heritage of Campania (Ministerial Decree of April 20, 1998, Ministry of Cultural and Environmental Heritage)] (Catalogue) (in Italian). Preface by Dr. Angelandrea Casale. Thefactory, for GEDI Gruppo Editoriale S.p.A.

=== Journal and encyclopedia articles ===
- Luigi Tufano (2020). "ZURLO (Zurolo)" [ZURLO (Zurolo)]. Treccani (Encyclopedia) (in Italian). 100.
