= Co-Cathedral of Santa Maria Assunta (Giovinazzo) =

Cathedral in Apulia region, Italy

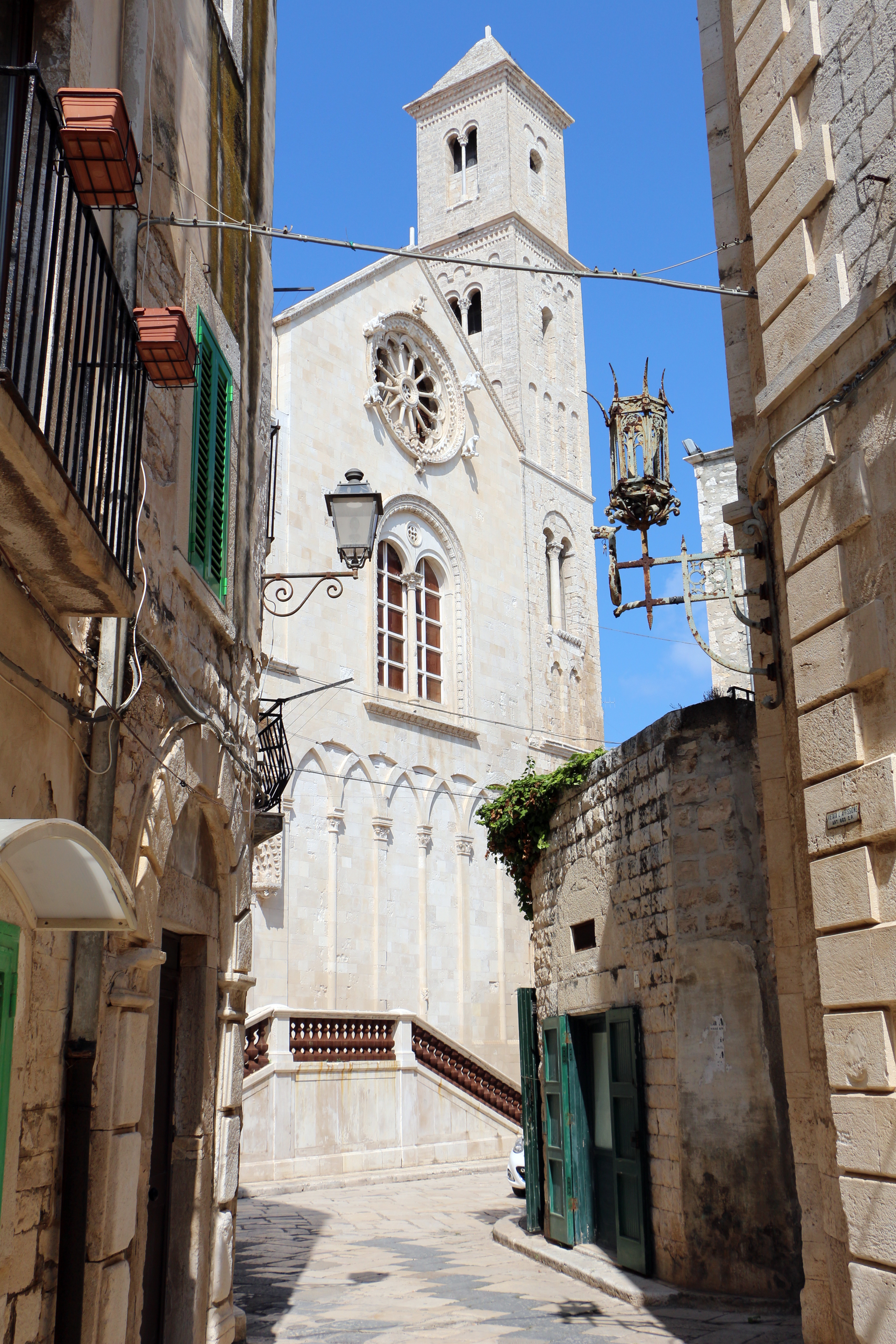
- The side entrance of the co-cathedral of Santa Maria Assunta in Giovinazzo, seen from the opposite road.
- Co-Cathedral of Santa Maria Assunta
- 41°11′22″N 16°40′24″E
- Location: Giovinazzo, Apulia
- Address: Square Duomo, nr. 2, Giovinazzo
- Country: Italy
- Denomination: Catholic

History
- Consecrated: 23 May 1283

Architecture
- Years built: 1125–1180

Administration
- Diocese: Molfetta-Ruvo-Giovinazzo-Terlizzi

The co-cathedral of Santa Maria Assunta in Giovinazzo stands on a pre-existing church dedicated to Santa Maria dell'Episcopio.

It is the mother church of the city.

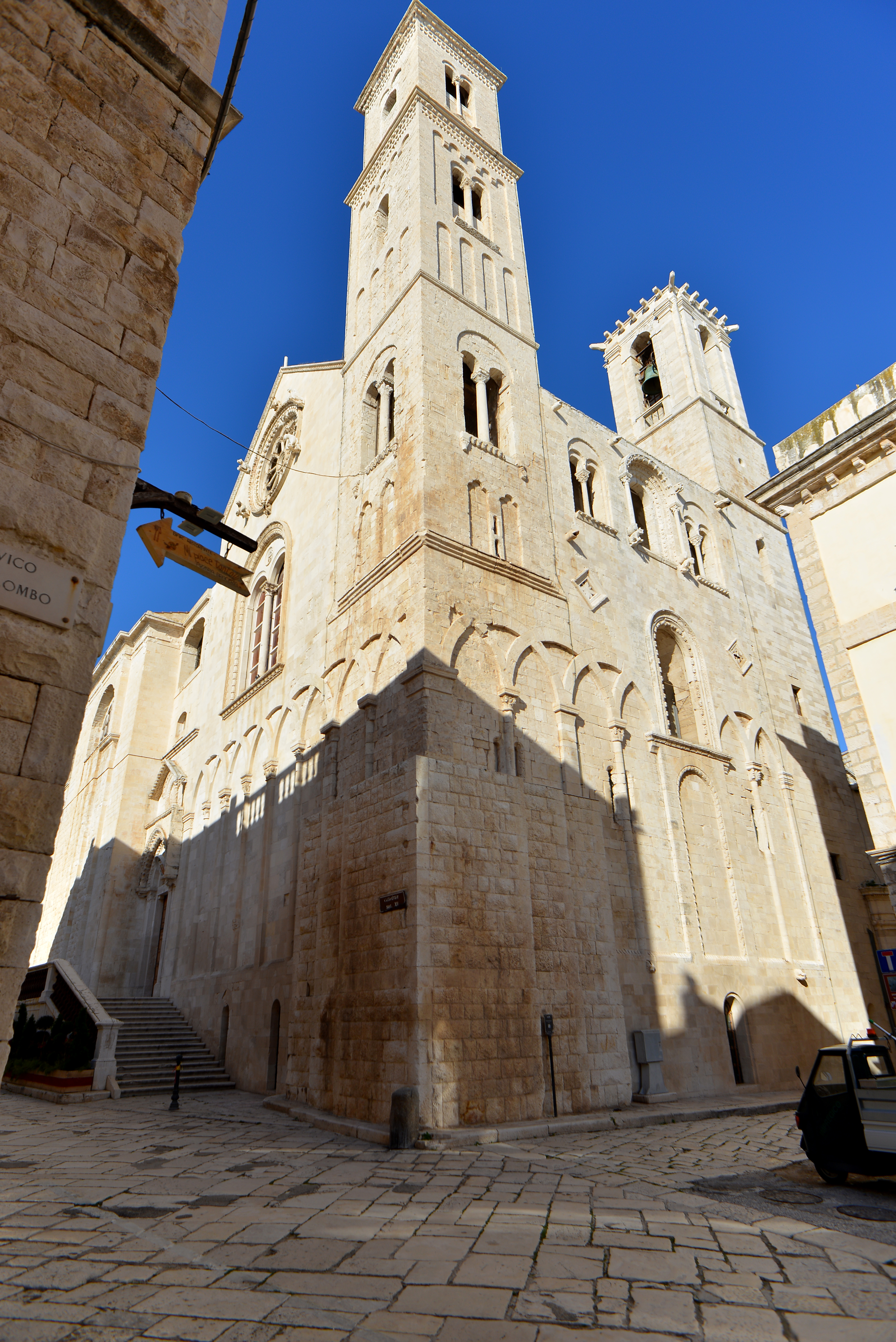
The co-cathedral of Santa Maria Assunta in Giovinazzo, between square Duomo and street Marco Polo.

== History ==
The building was constructed in 1113 and consecrated in 1283.

It is attested that the first bishop of the co-cathedral was a certain Grimoaldo or Grimaldo, around the year 1022.

The current cathedral, which stands on the site of an older building, called by the sources Santa Maria de Episcopio, was built during the 12th century in the Norman age, dating back to between 1125 (beginning of the construction of the crypt) and 1180 (completion of the upper church).

The building was consecrated only a century later, on 23 May 1283. The Romanesque cathedral had three naves divided by columns, with a trussed ceiling, false galleries and a mosaic floor. Few traces remain of this church today, due to the renovation works on the building during the eighteenth century (between 1730 and 1752 under bishop Paolo de Mercuzo), which led to the total renovation of the interiors according to the baroque taste: they belong to the ancient Romanesque church the rear façade, closed between two bell towers (of which the smallest, however, is from the seventeenth century), part of the presbytery area and the crypt.

It is known that on 16 July 1522 Duke Don Ferdinando of Capua received homage from the two mayors of the squares and the body of the Universitas (city title).

It is worth noting that some members of the noble Chyurlia family held important religious positions in the co-cathedral during the 16th century.

The city of Terlizzi was declared co-cathedral of Giovinazzo by Pope Benedict XIV due to a dispute over the acquisition of Pious Institutes between the city of Terlizzi and the prelates of Giovinazzo; the title of co-cathedral was later abolished.

The new organ dates back to 1779, commissioned by La Pegna.

On 25 April 1843 the insignia of the mozzetta of the cathedral of Giovinazzo was granted, with the cappa magna.

=== Other events ===
In the 1970s, various ancient documents were lost due to theft in the diocese of Piglia but the Carabinieri of Apulia made a major discovery of the various manuscripts, including some of those from the co-cathedral of Giovinazzo, recovered in 2010.

On 6 January 2025, the bishop of the diocese H.E. Monsignor Domenico Cornacchia presided over the mass and opened the holy door of the Co-Cathedral.

== Description ==
Inside, the church has three naves divided by pillars, with a large transept, three side chapels on each side, and a large main altar. The apse is completely covered with canvases by the Giovinazzo painter Carlo Rosa from 1676, which depict Maria Assunta and other saints. In the right arm of the transept and in the presbytery area, during the restoration work of the 1990s, traces of mosaics from the ancient Romanesque flooring of the cathedral were brought to light, dating back to the end of the 12th century.

The altars of the side chapels are dedicated to the Blessed Sacrament, Santa Maria delle Grazie, Blessed Nicola Pagla, the Crucifix, Santa Maria di Loreto and San Francesco Saverio. The most important is the chapel of the Blessed Sacrament, built in 1768 by Gennaro Sammartino and Crescenzo Tronchese. Of particular historical-artistic value are two panels: one from the thirteenth century, of Byzantine workmanship, depicting the Madonna of Corsignano; and the other fifteenth-century one depicting the Redeemer.

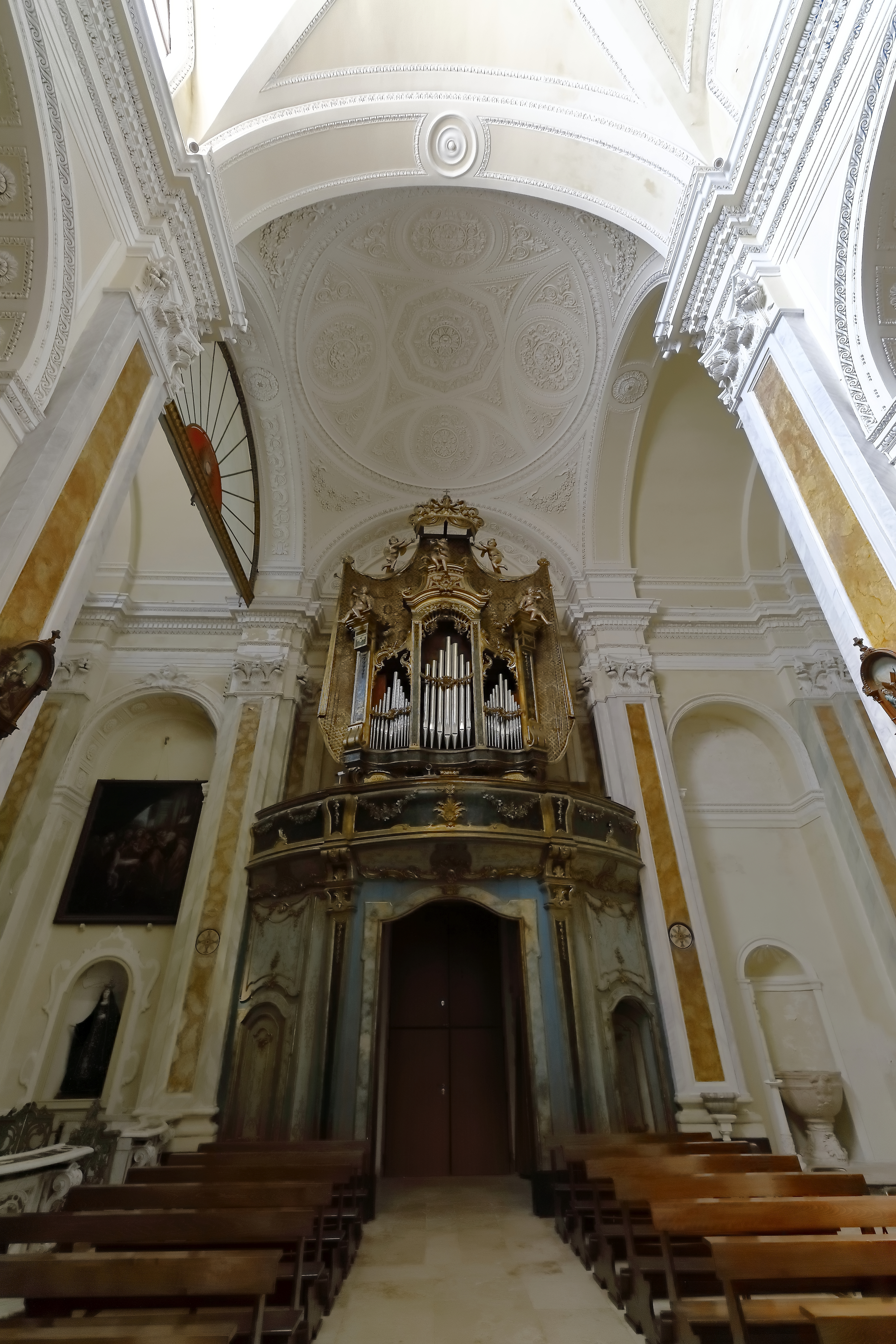
The organ of the co-cathedral.

=== The organs ===
An ancient organ could be found above the presbytery in the altar of the royal chapel, according to the documents written in a pastoral visit of Bishop Joannes Antolinez Brizianos de la Ribeira.

The current organ of the Giovinazzo cathedral dates back to the 15th century. XVII, from the year 1724, commissioned by the bishop mons. Giacinto Gaetano Chiurlia (or Chyurlia), replacing an earlier one, dated 15th century. XV.

Monsignor Paolo de Mercurio, who succeeded Bishop Chiurlia, in 1741, through his money and that of Monte dello Spoglio (view as Mount of piety, it was a local Christian religious credit institution of the time, still extinct), built a new organ in Bari to be placed in the co-cathedral.

It was restored for the first time by Luigi Mentasti in the 19th century.

The organ was restored a second time, in recent times by Pagliarulo Pierfrancesco, taking it to Castellana Grotte, between the years 2002–2003.

=== The crypt ===
The cathedral of Giovinazzo has an extensive and very ancient crypt, in fact the remains of pre-Christian capitals were found around a robbery that occurred in May 1898.

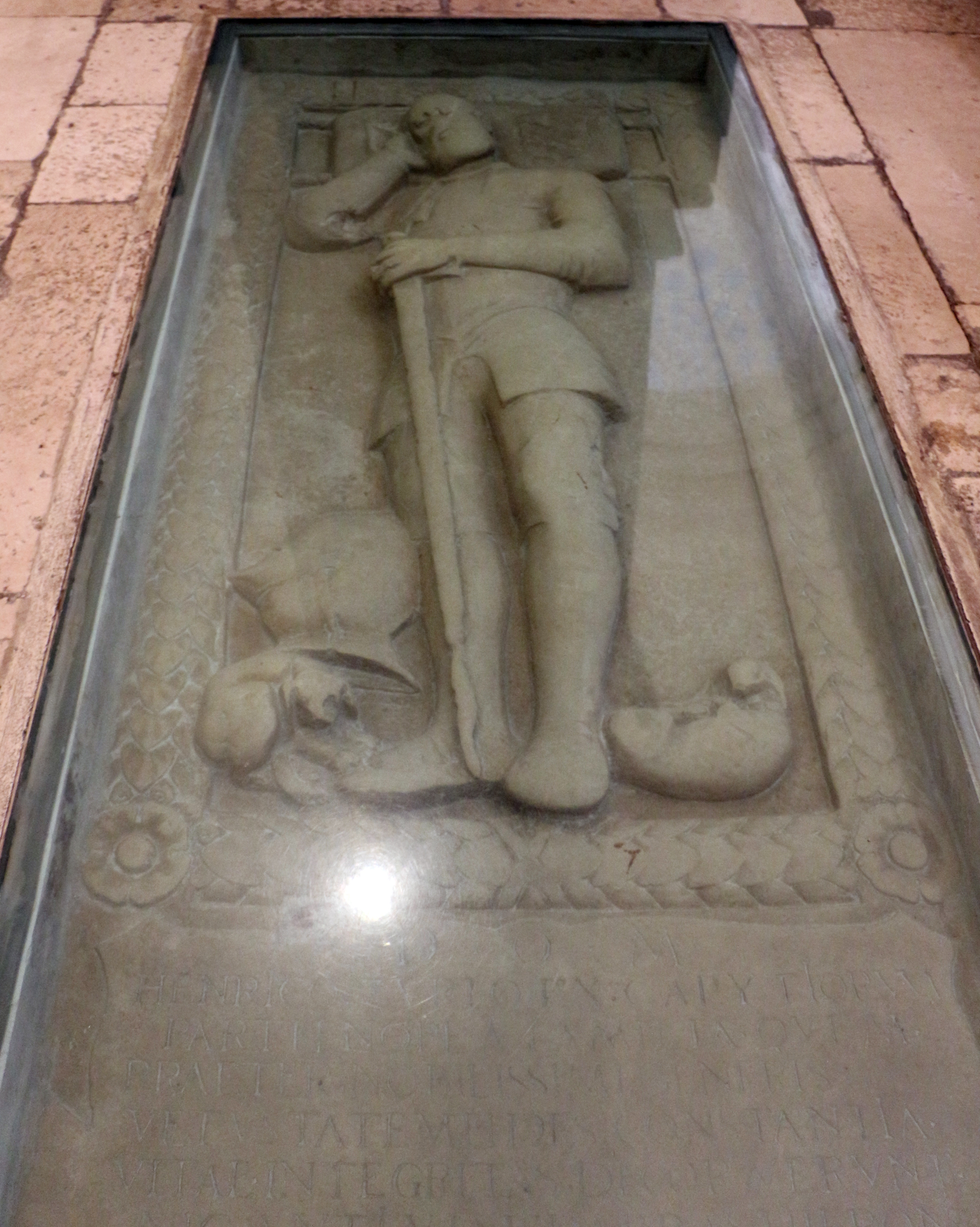
Terragna marble tombstone, bearing the recumbent figure in relief of the knight armed with shields depicting the noble arm of the House with an epigraph, sculpted by the noble captain Enrico Zurolo (also called Enrico Zurlo), which is preserved in the co-cathedral of Santa Maria Assunta in Giovinazzo (BA).

=== The scrolls ===
The archive present in the crypt of the Giovinazzo co-cathedral contained a number of 1437 parchments, drawn up and rearranged for the first time by two local scholars, in 1958.

Over the years, other researchers found other parchments and only in 2002 were they organized and cataloged in a summary sheet.

=== The tombstones ===
From the left nave you go down into the crypt, the oldest part of the cathedral. It is made up of 10 bare columns and 12 pillars protruding from the perimeter walls. Tombstones are present in the walls and floor; among these that of the young Antonio Sindolfi of 1386.

There is also a tomb of a knight, one Enrico Zurolo (or Enrico Zurlo), belonging to the noble Zurolo family of the same name. On the Terragna tombstone we read: D.O.M. | HENRICO ZVRVLO FORMER CAPYTIORVM PARTENOPEA | FAMILIA QUEM PRAETER | NOBILISSISSI GENERIS VETVSTATEM FIDES | COSTANTIA VITA INTEGRITAS DECORARVNT | NI. ANT. I.V.D. ET ABBAS HIERON | FILII PIESS PATRI OPT. PP. MDXLII VIX AN. LXIII | VSQUE AD DIEM NOVISSIMVM.

=== Restorations ===
On 24 July 2022, the chapel of the crucifix was reopened to the public after a Eucharistic celebration and the works of art were also relocated to their main places in the minor altar.

From February 2023 until mid-June 2024, important restoration works on the attic of the co-cathedral were initiated, using the 8x1000 (see eight per thousand) funds intended for the Roman Catholic Church.

== Bibliography ==
=== Historical sources ===
- Raffaella Cassano; Sergio Leonardi (2001). Cosimo Damiano Fonseca (ed.). Cattedrali di Puglia, una storia lunga duemila anni [Cathedrals of Apulia, a two thousand year history] (in Italian). Illustrators: Nicola Amato, Sergio Leonardi. Bari (BA): M. Adda. ISBN 9788880824336.
- Ezio De Cillis (1989). La cattedrale di Giovinazzo. Restauri e rinvenimenti, in Cultura e società in Puglia in età sveva e angioina [The cathedral of Giovinazzo. Restorations and discoveries, in Culture and society in Apulia in the Swabian and Angevin ages] (in Italian). Bitonto (BA): F. Moretti. pp. 327–364.
- ALPAGHIAN: Raccolta di scritti in onore di Adriano Alpago Novello [ALPAGHIAN: Collection of writings in honor of Adriano Alpago Novello] (in Italian). Naples (NA): ScriptaWeb. 2004. ISBN 9788889543061.
- Rosanna Bianco; et al. (Parma Savings Bank Foundation, University of Parma. Center for medieval studies) (19–23 September 2006). Arturo Carlo Quintavalle (ed.). La cattedrale di Giovinazzo, in Medioevo: l'Europa delle cattedrali, Atti del Convegno Internazionale di Studio (Parma, 19–23 settembre 2006) [The cathedral of Giovinazzo, in the Middle Ages: the Europe of cathedrals, Proceedings of the International Study Conference (Parma, 19–23 September 2006)] (Conference proceedings) (in English, French, and Italian). Parma (PR): Electa. pp. 328, 329, 330, 331, 332, 333, 334, 335 and 336. ISBN 9788837056575.
- Patrizia Mainoni (June 28, 2011). Patrizia Mainoni (ed.). "Con animo virile" Donne e potere nel Mezzogiorno medievale (secoli XI-XV) [«With a Virile Soul» Women and Power in the Medieval South (11th-15th Centuries)] (E-book) (in Italian). Presentation: Grazia Distaso. Viella Libreria Editrice. pp. 118, 222 and 260. ISBN 9788883346576.
- Enrica Leonardis (November 27, 2015). Architettura romanica pugliese – Il progetto e la costruzione in pietra portante dell'edificio per il culto [Apulian romanesque architecture - Design and construction in bearing-stone of the building for worship] (E-book) (in Italian). Translation: Roberta Combei (2nd ed.). Gangemi Editore. pp. 9–10, 18, 81, 87, 203, 295 and XXI. ISBN 9788849281446.
- Gennaro Zurolo (2017). "THE ZUROLOS, Simplified ascending family line". La Città nobile di Giovinazzo e Frà Giovanni Capece Zurlo seu Zurolo, Ammiraglio e Balì dei Cavalieri di Malta nel XVII secolo (alla luce di documenti inediti) [The noble city of Giovinazzo and Frà Giovanni Capece Zurlo seu Zurolo, Admiral and Bailiff of the Knights of Malta in the 17th century (in the light of unpublished documents)] (in Italian). Rome (RM). pp. 30, 144.
- Michele Bonserio (February 11, 2022). Inventario analitico dei documenti cartacei dell'Archivio Capitolare della Cattedrale di Giovinazzo. Sec. XV-sec. XIX [Analytical inventory of paper documents in the Chapter Archives of the Cathedral of Giovinazzo. Section 15th-century XIX] (in Italian). Gambini Editore, Pro Loco Association of Giovinazzo. ISBN 9791280787255.
- Gennaro Zurolo (2024). "IV". Casa Zurolo. Origini e sviluppo di una famiglia feudale dell'Italia meridionale [Zurolo House. Origins and development of a feudal family from Southern Italy] (in Italian). p. 114.
- Diego de Ceglia; Francesco De Nicolo (November 1, 2024). La Cattedrale di Giovinazzo. Fonti archivistiche e saggi di lavoro [The Cathedral of Giovinazzo. Archival sources and work essays] (in Italian). La Nuova Mezzina. ISBN 9788898868551.

=== Archival sources ===
- Attilio Zuccagni Orlandini (1845). "24.Circondatario di Terlizzi" [24. Terlizzi District]. In from publishers (ed.). Corografia fisica, storica e statistica dell'Italia e delle sue isole, corredata di un atlante, di mappe geografiche e topografiche, e di altre tavole illustrative, Supplemento al volume undecimo. 11.1 · Volume 11 [Physical, historical and statistical chorography of Italy and its islands, accompanied by an atlas, geographical and topographical maps, and other illustrative tables, Supplement to the eleventh volume. 11.1 · Volume 11] (in Italian). Vol. 11. Florence (FI). pp. 155–157.
- Domenicantonio Vacca (1846). "INSEGNE ECCLESIASTICHE" [ECCLESIASTICAL INSIGNIA]. Supplimento all'Indice generale alfabetico della collezione delle leggi e dei decreti per il Regno delle Due Sicilie distinto per materie con ordine cronologico dall'anno 1841 a tutto il 1845 per cura di Domenicantonio Vacca [Supplement to the general alphabetical index of the collection of laws and decrees for the Kingdom of the Two Sicilies divided by subjects in chronological order from the year 1841 to the end of 1845 edited by Domenicantonio Vacca] (in Italian). Naples (NA): Stab. tip. In the Sign of the Anchor. p. 165.
- Goffredo di Grollalanza (1892). "MEMORIE STORICHE" [HISTORICAL MEMORIES]. Giornale araldico-genealogico-diplomatico [Heraldic-genealogical-diplomatic journal] (in Italian). Vol. 1. Bari (BA): At the direction of the heraldic journal. pp. 366–375.
- G. De Ninno; N. Di Cagno-Politi; E. Rogadeo; L-Sylos (December 1894). Archivio storico pugliese, organo della Società di Storia Patria per la Puglia · Volume 1 [Apulian historical archive, organ of the Society of Homeland History for Puglia · Volume 1]. 1 (in Italian). Vol. 1. Bari (BA): Apulian Historical Studies Society, Publishing. p. 62.
- Giovanni Battista Nitto De Rossi; Francesco Nitti di Vito (1899). Le pergamene del Duomo di Bai (continuazione) 1266–1309. Appendice: Le pergamene di Giovinazzo, Canosa e Putignano sino al 1266 [The parchments of the Cathedral of Bai (continued) 1266–1309. Appendix: The parchments of Giovinazzo, Canosa and Putignano up to 1266] (in Italian). Bari (BA).
- Vincenzo Monachino, ed. (1990). Guida degli archivi diocesani d'Italia, Volume 3 [Guide to the diocesan archives of Italy, Volume 3] (in Italian). Vol. 3. Ministero per i beni culturali e ambientali, Ufficio centrale per i beni archivistici. ISBN 9788871251493.

=== Secondary sources ===
- Antonio Paolucci; Robi Ronza; Roberto Zagnoli (1998). Cattedrali e basiliche in Italia [Cathedrals and Basilicas in Italy] (Blossura) (in Italian). G. Mondadori. p. 206. ISBN 9788837415822.
- Raffaella Cassano; Sergio Leonardi (2001). Cosimo Damiano Fonseca (ed.). Cattedrali di Puglia, una storia lunga duemila anni [Cathedrals of Apulia, a two thousand year long history] (in Italian). Photographs: Nicola Amato, Sergio Leonardi. M. Adda. pp. 121–123. ISBN 9788880824336.
- Giacomo Bassi; Sabato Angieri; Matteo Mangili (July 24, 2019). Puglia [Puglia] (E-book) (in Italian). EDT, Lonely Planet. ISBN 9788859264439.

=== Newspaper articles ===
- Pasquale Corsi; Grazia Distaso; Trifone Gargano; Clara Gelao; Ferdinando Merizzi; Pasquale Rossi; Ugo Rubini; Pietro Sisto (December 2013). "L'organo della Cattedrale di Giovinazzo" [The organ of the Cathedral of Giovinazzo]. Fogli di Periferia (in Italian) (1–2). Putignano (BA): Grafiche Vito Radio Editore srl: 61–69. ISSN 2284-0710 – via Academia.edu.
- Michele de Palma (2016). "L'obituario trecentesco della Cattedrale di Giovinazzo" [The fourteenth-century obituary of the Giovinazzo Cathedral]. Settentrione-Nuova Serie (in Italian) (28). Painosalama Oy, Turku: 31–32. ISSN 1237-9964.
- Diego De Ceglio (October 10, 2018). "LA CRIPTA DELLA CATTEDRALE DI GIOVINAZZO TRA XIX E XX SECOLO ("I segreti del tempo" raccontati in memoria di don Gaetano Valente)" [THE CRYPT OF THE GIOVINAZZO CATHEDRAL BETWEEN THE 19TH AND 20TH CENTURIES ("The secrets of time" told in memory of Don Gaetano Valente)]. La Piazza di Giovinazzo (in Italian) (30): 20–21.

== See also ==
- Co-cathedral
- Giovinazzo
- Organ (music)
- Santa Maria Assunta
- Terlizzi
