= Giuseppe Zurlo =

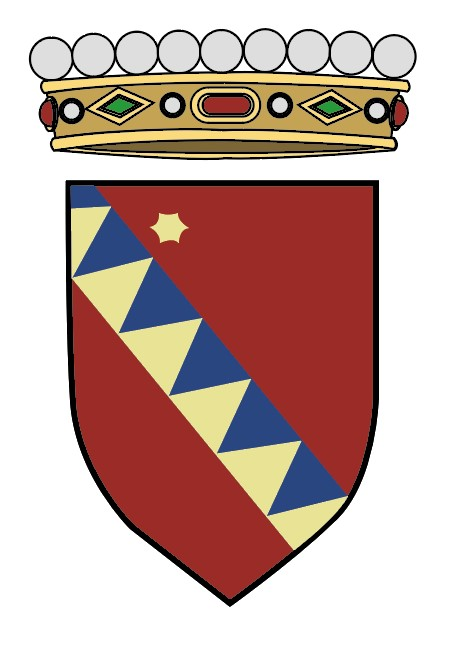
- Monarch: Ferdinand I of the Two Sicilies
- Minister: Minister of Justice and Worship (February 1809 – November 1809); Minister of the Interior (5 November 1809 – May 1815)
- Preceded by: Diego Naselli; Andrea Francesco
- Succeeded by: Raimondo De Gennaro
- Monarch: Gioacchino Murat
- Succeeded by: Donato Tommasi

Personal details
- Party: Murat Conservatories
- Profession: Jurist

Giuseppe Zurlo, also called Giuseppe Zurolo (Baranello, 6 November 1757 – Naples, 10 November 1828), was an Italian jurist and politician.

He is a descendant of the noble Neapolitan House of Zurolo, also known as Zurlo family.

== Biography ==
He born in Baranello in 1757, he descendant of the noble Neapolitan Zurolo family, also known as Zurlo family.

A member of the Freemasonry, in 1784 he became Scottish Master of the aristocratic lodge La Vittoria of Naples, elevated by the Grand Lodge of London to a provincial Grand Lodge. In 1813 he was Deputy Grand Master of the Grand Orient of Naples.

From a young age he held highly prestigious judicial and administrative positions within the administration of the Kingdom of Naples, up to that of Minister of Finance, under Ferdinand I, and Minister of the Interior during the French government (1806 –1815) and during the riots of 1820. As Minister of the Interior, Giuseppe managed the process of abolition of feudalism, decreed with a series of provisions approved by the sovereigns Joseph Bonaparte and Gioacchino Murat between 1806 and 1811.

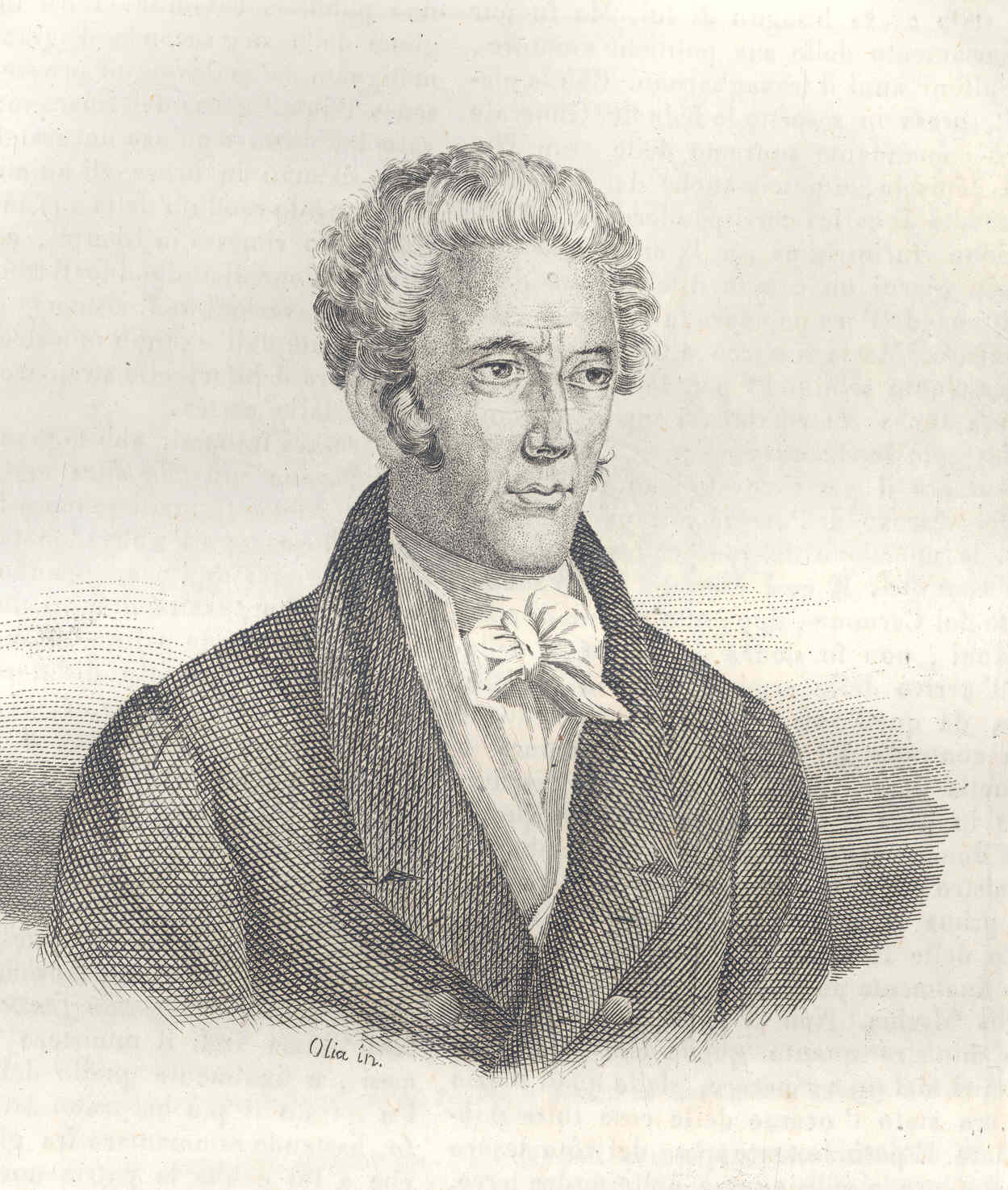
Copper plate engraving from 1839 depicting Count Giuseppe Zurlo.

He decreed the transfer of disputes between the barons and the municipality to the feudal commission, removing them from the ordinary judiciary. The commission, an extraordinary judiciary whose procedures reflected the vertical logic typical of the executive and whose sentences were final, proved to be much faster and more effective in resolving disputes and in executing the law.

A staunch supporter of the need for a radical change in the system of government, Giuseppe, through his personal life experience, knew first-hand the ills that afflicted the populations of the South. In addition to the economic and social problems of his homeland, Molise, he had a thorough knowledge of the conditions of Calabria, where he stayed on two occasions: the first time, as a member of the commission set up to investigate the earthquake of 1783, and a second time, in 1790, when he was a judge of the Gran Corte della Vicaria.

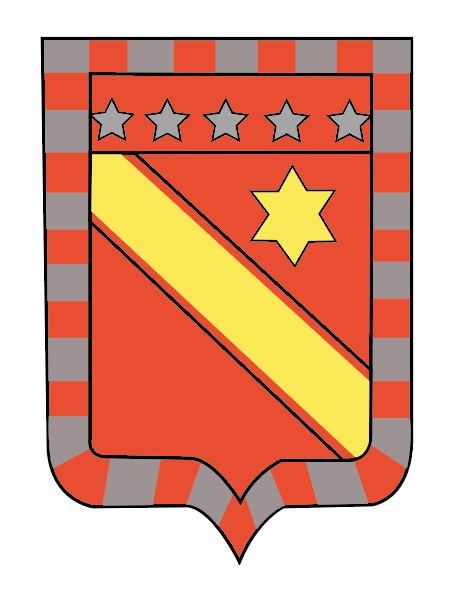
Coat of arms of the Zurlo or Zullo or Zurolo family (Baranello branch): red, with a gold cuneate band. and Idem: red, with a gold band bordered in blue flanked by a star (6 rays), with a chief sewn in red charged with five silver stars arranged in a band surrounded by a silver and red chequered border – coat of arms granted together with the title of Count, by virtue of the Royal Decree of 25 March 1811, by Gioacchino Murat.

On this occasion he was given the task of carrying out a survey of the "defenses" of the Regia Sila and a verification of the occupations and usurpations of various lands carried out by local owners to the detriment of the royal state property.

In 1827 he became the president of the Academy of Sciences. He remained poor, heavily in debt and ill, in his last phase of life and no longer attended the sessions of the Academy.

=== Death ===
He died in Naples in 1828, his remains are preserved there, in the ossuary of the SS. Trinità dei Pellegrini brotherhood.

== Assignments ==
- Minister of Justice and Worship (February 1809 – November 1809);
- Minister of the Interior (5 November 1809 – May 1815).

== Writings ==
=== Books ===
- Giuseppe Zurlo (1811). typography of Angelo Trani (ed.). Rapporto sullo stato del regno di Napoli, dopo l'avvenimento al trono di S.M. il re Gioacchino Napoleone, per tutto l'anno 1809, presentato al Re ... dal ministro dell'Interno. [Signé] [Report on the state of the kingdom of Naples after the accession to the throne of His Majesty King Joachim Napoleon for the entire year 1809 ... , Naples, typ. A. Trani, 1811] (in Italian). Naples (NA).
- Giuseppe Zurlo; Renato Lalli (1978). Rapporto sullo stato del regno di Napoli nel 1809 [Report on the state of the kingdom of Naples in 1809] (in Italian). Naples (NA): Marinelli.
- Giuseppe Zurlo (1812). typography of Angelo Trani (ed.). Rapporto sullo stato del regno di Napoli per gli anni 1810, e 1811 presentato al re nel suo consiglio di stato dal Ministro dell'interno [Report on the state of the kingdom of Naples for the years 1810 and 1811 presented to the king in his council of state by the Minister of the Interior] (in Italian). Naples (NA).
- Giuseppe Zurlo; Ministry of Internal Affairs of the Kingdom of the Two Sicilies (1820). Napoli 18 novembre 1820. Eccellentissimi signori Allorchè furono istallate le Deputazioni provinciali ... [Naples 18 November 1820. Most excellent gentlemen When the provincial Deputations were installed ...] (in Italian). Naples (NA).

=== Letters ===
- Giuseppe Zurlo. Lettere a Monticelli [Letters to Monticelli] (in Italian). Naples (NA): National Library of Naples.

== Bibliography ==
=== Historical sources ===
- Pasquale Stanislao Mancini (1838). "Giuseppe Zurlo" [Giuseppe Zurlo]. L'Omnibus pittoresco, enciclopedia letteraria ed artistica · Volume 1 [The Picturesque Omnibus, literary and artistic encyclopedia · Volume 1] (in Italian). nr. 45. pp. 370, 371, 372, 373, 374, 375 and 376.
- Luigi Alberto Trotta (1870). Unione typ.-publishing press (ed.). Vita di Giuseppe Zurlo [Life of Giuseppe Zurlo] (in Italian). Turin (TO).
- Lydia Garofalo (1932). Giuseppe Zurlo (1759–1828) [Giuseppe Zurlo (1759–1828)] (in Italian). Naples (NA) – Perugia (PG).
- Giambattista Masciotta (1984) [1952]. Il Molise dalle origini ai nostri giorni, vol. III: Il Circondario d'Isernia [Molise from its origins to the present day, vol. III: The District of Isernia] (in Italian). Cava De' Tirreni (SA): Lampo. p. 145.
- Savarese Giacomo; Aldo Romano (1941). Tra rivoluzioni e reazioni. Ricordi su Giuseppe Zurlo (1759–1828). A cura di Aldo Romano [Between revolutions and reactions. Memories of Giuseppe Zurlo (1759–1828). Edited by Aldo Romano]. essays (in Italian). Turin (TO): Einaudi.
- Pasquale Villani (1955). Giuseppe Zurlo e la crisi dell'antico regime nel regno di Napoli [Giuseppe Zurlo and the crisis of the ancient regime in the kingdom of Naples] (in Italian). Vol. VII. Naples (NA). pp. 57, 127 and 158.
- Angela Valente (1965). Gioacchino Murat e l'Italia meridionale [Joachim Murat and Southern Italy] (in Italian). Turin (TO).
- Pasquale Villani (1977). Mezzogiorno tra riforme e rivoluzione [Midday between reforms and revolution] (in Italian). Rome (RM) – Bari (BA). pp. 213–330.
- Anna Maria Rao (1984). L'"Amaro della feudalità." La devoluzione di Arnone e la questione feudale a Napoli alla fine del '700 [The "Bitterness of Feudalism." The Devolution of Arnone and the Feudal Question in Naples at the End of the 18th Century] (E-book) (in Italian). Naples (NA): Guida. pp. 137, 163, 167, 268 and 380. ISBN 9788870422658.
- Ilaria Zilli (2000). Luca Michelini; Marco Enrico Luigi Guidi; Massimo M. Augello; Terenzio Maccabelli (eds.). Associazionismo economico e diffusione dell'economia politica nell'Italia dell'Ottocento dalle società economico-agrarie alle associazioni di economisti · Volume 1 [Economic associationism and the diffusion of political economy in 19th-century Italy from economic-agrarian societies to associations of economists · Volume 1] (in Italian). Vol. 1. F. Angeli. p. 319.
- Francesco Eriberto D'Ippolito (2004). L'amministrazione produttiva, crisi della mediazione togata e nuovi compiti dello Stato nell'opera di Giuseppe Zurlo (1759–1828) [Productive administration, crisis of professional mediation and new tasks of the State in the work of Giuseppe Zurlo (1759-1828)] (in Italian). Naples (NA): Jovane. pp. 22 and later. ISBN 9788824315142.
- Vittorio Gnocchini (2005). L'Italia dei liberi muratori, brevi biografie di massoni famosi [The Italy of free masons, short biographies of famous freemasons] (in Italian). Mimesis. p. 279. ISBN 9788884833624.
- Nico Perrone (2006). La Loggia della Philantropia. Un religioso danese a Napoli prima della rivoluzione. Con la corrispondenza massonica e altri documenti [The Lodge of Philanthropy. A Danish religious man in Naples before the revolution. With Masonic correspondence and other documents] (in Italian). Palermo (PA): Sellerio. ISBN 9788838921414.
- Ruggiero Di Castiglione (13 September 2014). La Massoneria nelle due Sicilie Vol. II, E i fratelli meridionali del '700 [Freemasonry in the Two Sicilies Vol. II, And the Southern Brothers of the 18th Century] (E-book) (in Italian). Naples (NA): Gangemi Editore. pp. 390, 391, 392, 393 and 394. ISBN 8849224001.
- Gennaro Zurolo (2021). Giuseppe Zurlo, ministro del Regno delle Due Sicilie, fonti per la storia degli Uomini Illustri del Regno di Napoli [Giuseppe Zurlo, Minister of the Kingdom of the Two Sicilies, Sources for the History of the Illustrious Men of the Kingdom of Naples] (in Italian).
- Gennaro Zurolo (2024). "I-parte 1, V-parte 2 e VII" [Part I 1, V-part 2 and VII]. Casata Zurolo. Origini e sviluppo di una famiglia feudale del Meridione d'Italia [Casata Zurolo. Origins and Development of a Feudal Family of Southern Italy] (in Italian). pp. 18, 180 and 220.

=== Archival sources ===
- Archivio di Stato di Napoli, Collegio dei Dottori [State Archives of Naples, College of Doctors]. 106/131 (in Italian).
- Notizie su la condotta politica di Giuseppe Zurlo [News on Giuseppe Zurlo's political conduct] (in Italian) (3nd ed.). 1820.

=== Secondary sources ===
- Per la promozione del signor D. Gioseppe Z. alla carica di Presidente della Regia Camera ed avvocato fiscale del Regal Patrimonio [For the promotion of Mr. D. Giuseppe Z. to the position of President of the Royal Chamber and tax lawyer of the Royal Patrimony] (in Italian). Naples (NA). 1798.
- Elogio del conte Giuseppe Zurlo ordinato dall'Accademia delle Scienze della Società Reale Borbonica [In Praise of Count Giuseppe Zurlo Ordered by the Academy of Sciences of the Royal Bourbon Society] (in Italian). Naples (NA). 1832.
- Supplimento del Bullettino della Commissione feudale, vol. XVII: Continuazione della soluzione de’ dubbj surti nell’esecuzione delle decisioni della Commissione prima e dopo del Real decreto dei 3 luglio 1810 [Supplement to the Bulletin of the Feudal Commission, vol. XVII: Continuation of the solution of the doubts that arose in the execution of the decisions of the Commission before and after the Royal Decree of 3 July 1810] (in Italian). Trani Printing House. 1842. pp. 284, 285, 286, 287, 288, 289, 299, 300, 301 and 302.
- Carlo De Nicola; Giuseppe De Blasiis (1906). Diario napoletano 1798–1825, Parte I-III. · Volume 3 [Neapolitan Diary 1798–1825, Part I-III. · Volume 3] (in Italian). Vol. 3. Neapolitan society of national history. pp. 97, 200 and 335.
- Luca de Samuele Cagnazzi; et al. (Alessandro Cutolo) (1944). Alessandro Cutolo (ed.). La mia vita [My life] (in Italian). Milan (MI): U. Hoepli. pp. 14, 71, 73, 74, 75, 76, 77, 78, 79, 80, 81, 82, 83, 84, 85, 86, 87, 88, 89, 90, 91, 92, 93, 94, 95, 96, 97, 98, 99, 100, 101, 102, 103, 104, 105, 106, 107, 108, 109, 110, 111, 112, 113, 114, 115, 116, 117, 133, 141, 142, 143, 144, 145, 146, 147, 148, 150, 156, 157, 158, 173 and 203.

=== Yearbooks and essays ===
- Pasquale Villani (1955). Giuseppe Zurlo e la crisi dell'antico regime nel Regno di Napoli [Giuseppe Zurlo and the crisis of the old regime in the Kingdom of Naples] (in Italian) (VII ed.). Turin (TO): Annuario dell’Istituto storico italiano per l’età moderna e contemporanea. pp. 55–168.

=== Magazines ===
- Anna Maria Rao (1986). "La prima restaurazione borbonica" [The first Bourbon restoration]. Storia del Mezzogiorno (in Italian). IV, tome 2. Rome (RM): 541, 542, 543, 544, 545, 555, 556, 557, 558, 559, 560, 561, 562, 563, 564, 565, 566, 567, 568, 569, 570, 571, 572, 573 and 574.

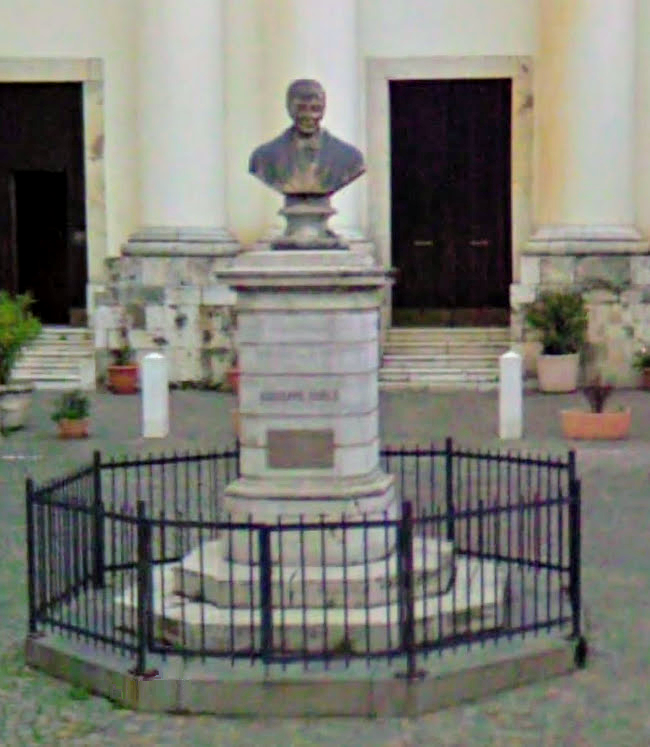
The restored bronze sculptural bust with dedication to the minister of the Kingdom of Naples, by Count Giuseppe Zurlo, located in the square of the same name, in front of the rebuilt church of San Michele Arcangelo in Baranello.

== Dedications ==
- In front of the rebuilt church of San Michele Arcangelo in Baranello, there is a town square that bears his name Largo Conte Zurlo, formerly Largo Zullo.
- There is a monument with a bust depicting the minister of the same name in Largo Conte Zurlo. The monument was also rebuilt after the earthquake in southern Calabria in 1783, which also hit the Molise region. In the monument there are two tombstones, in which the one written with Roman numerals indicates the original date of foundation, dating back to 1892, while the other written in Italian indicates the date of its reconstruction, with the inauguration on 19 October 1997, by the then provincial and municipal administration of the region.

== See also ==
- Baranello
- Freemasonry
- Grand Lodge of London
- House of Zurolo
- Kingdom of Naples
- 1783 Calabrian earthquakes
- Minister of Finance
- Minister of the Interior
- Naples
