= Caracciolo (surname) =

Caracciolo (Italian pronunciation: [kaˈrattʃolo]) is an Italian surname most associated with the noble House of Carácciolo from the Kingdom of Naples.

- Alberto Caracciolo (1918–1994), Argentinian musician
- Alessia Caracciolo (born 1996), Canadian musician better known as Alessia Cara
- Andrea Caracciolo (born 1981), Italian footballer
- Battistello Caracciolo (1578–1635), Italian painter
- Fabio Caracciolo (born 1984), Belgian footballer of Italian descent
- Francesco Caracciolo (1752–1799), Italian admiral and revolutionist
- Franco Caracciolo (1920–1999), Italian conductor
- Pasqual or Pasquale Caracciolo (fl. 1566–1608), author of La gloria del cavallo Venice 1566 ("The Glory of the Horse")
- Rosa Caracciolo (born 1972), Hungarian model and wife of Italian pornographic actor Rocco Siffredi (Rocco Tano)

== See also ==
- Caracciolo (disambiguation)
