= Vico and Vicoletto of Zuroli =

Two historic alleys in Naples, Italy

Vico, and Vicoletto, of Zuroli
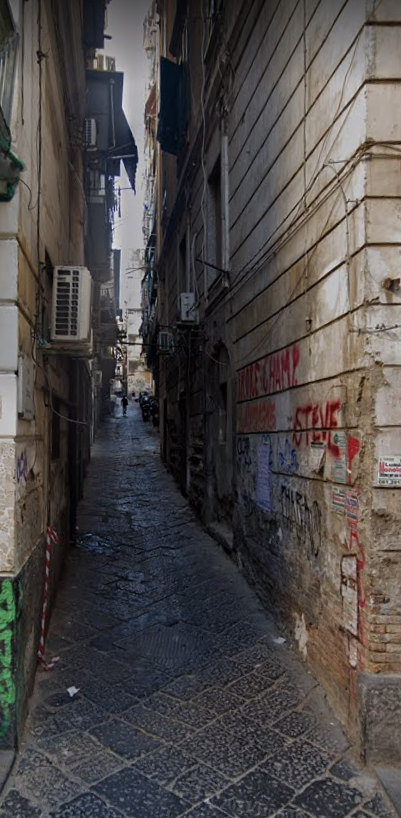
- The entrance to the alley from via Duomo.
- Type: Alley
- Length: 1
- Area: Decumano Inferiore
- Location: Between Via dei Tribunali and Via Forcelle, in Naples, Campania, Italy
- Quarter: Pendino

The Vico, and Vicoletto, of Zuroli, more commonly called Vicolo dei Zuroli (formerly Vico de' Boccapianola) are two historic alleys located in the historic center of the city of Naples, they are located near Via Forcella (Furcella in Neapolitan dialect), near the church of Pio Monte della Misericordia, art museum and historical place of Naples since 2005, between Via dei Tribunali and Via Vicaria Vecchia, in the Pendino district.

In the Vicolo dei Zuroli there is an ancient noble palace, which previously belonged to the noble Boccapianola family and subsequently acquired, restored and enlarged by another noble Neapolitan family, that of House of Zurolo from which they took their name.

They converge in Via Carminiello ai Mannesi, where the archaeological excavations of San Carminiello ai Mannesi are located, from which the street takes its name.

== Ubivation ==
=== Construction ===
The Vico, and the Vicoletto, of Zuroli are located behind Via Duomo, in the Decumani area, the ancient center of the city. The alley is located between the Decumano Maggiore in the upper part of Via dei Tribunali and the Decumano Inferior (more commonly known as Spaccanapoli) in the lower part of Via Vicaria Vecchia, in the ancient Capuana district (so called because there was a road that led to the Campania city of Capua), the current Pendino district.

=== Stenopoi ===
The Greek system provided for a strictly orthogonal road scheme in which three streets, the widest (about six metres) and largest, parallel to each other, called plateiai (singular: plateia), crossed the ancient urban center dividing it into four parts. Furthermore, these main streets were cut perpendicularly, from north to south, by other smaller streets (about three meters wide) called stenopoi (singular: stenopos) or more improperly cardini, which streets today constitute the alleys of the historic city center, these streets were intersected perpendicularly by stenopoi in a north–south direction, still recognizable today in streets such as: Via Atri, Vico Giganti, Via Duomo, Vico Zuroli (plural) seu Zurolo (singular) and many others.

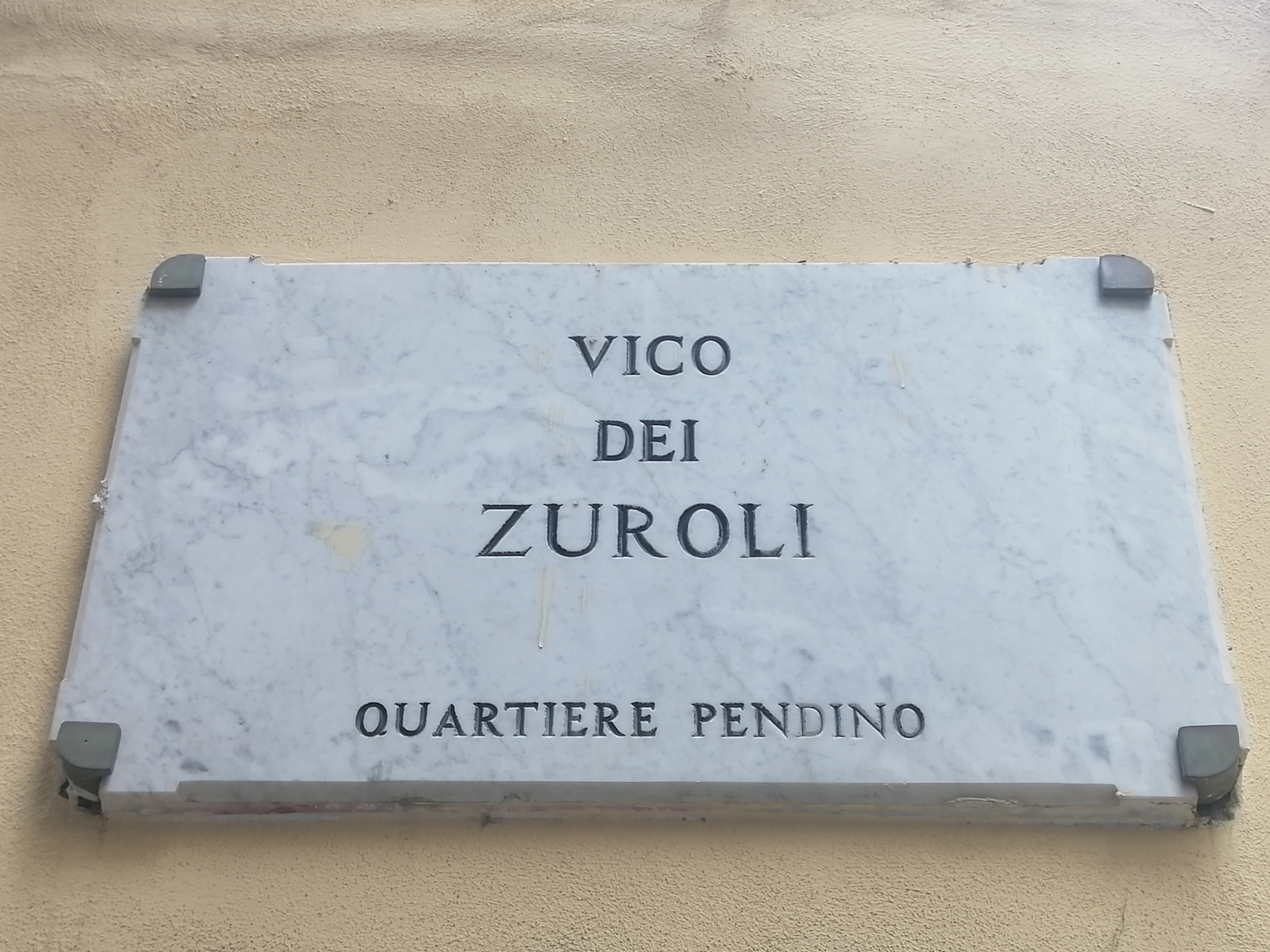
Street plaque – Vico dei Zuroli, from which it takes its name from the noble Zurolo family, placed on a wall of a building located in the Pendino district of Naples.

== History ==
=== The Boccapianola family ===
In ancient times the place was called Boccapianoli, from the surname of the noble Boccapianola family who once lived there.

In the year 1301 Giovanni Boccapianola had a noble palace built near the church of Pio Monte della Misericordia, by the architect Giacomo De Sanctis, in pure Gothic style.

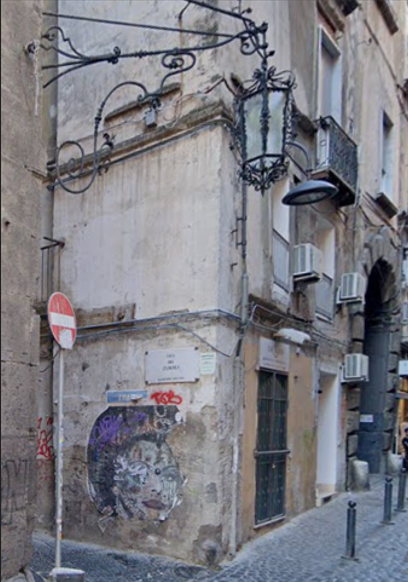
Via dei Tribunali, view (from left), Palazzo Zuroli seu Zurolo, century XIV-XV.

=== The Zurolo family ===
The noble Zurolo family then found a home there, between the 14th and 15th centuries, obtained the seat of Porta di Capuana as for the other Neapolitan noble families, they then acquired the noble palace tha belong to the Boccapianola family, from this noble prosapia, structural changes and expansion.

Subsequently, the toponym of this place was replaced by Vico or Vicoletto dei Boccapianoli into Vico, and Vicoletto, dei Zuroli from which it took its name from the aforementioned palace rebuilt by the Zurolo family of which some exponents most representative lived there.

=== Greco-Roman aqueduct ===
It is attested that a small branch of the Greco-Roman aqueduct of Naples also passed through the Vico dei Zuroli, from Via dei Tribunali to Via Forcella, making it a circuit; the water conveyed was called acqua della Bolla, because it was also called Polla from the hill that rose underground.

=== Stories linked to the place ===
In 1898 Almerinda d'Ettorre, a young 25-year-old woman who lived in Vico dei Zuroli at number 2, began to have apocalyptic visions of the future of the world and then made religious prophecies, also claiming to be in direct contact with Jesus Christ, the which would have foretold her own death and resurrection, which should have occurred on 10 August of that same year.

Arriving at the fateful 10 August, nothing of what she predicted happened, nor did she perish at the hands of God. At the end of the episode, the Catholic Church defined the case of Almerinda d'Ettorre as a phenomenon of demonic possession.

== See also ==
- Alley
- Cardo
- Gothic architecture
- Historic Centre of Naples
- House of Zurolo
- Naples
- Neapolitan language
- Palace
- Pendino
- Pio Monte della Misericordia
- Plateia
- Quarters of Naples
- Spaccanapoli (street)
- Spirit possession
- Via dei Tribunali, Naples
- Zurolo

== Bibliography ==
=== Historical sources ===
- Luigi Volpicella (1648). Reame di Napoli, Patriziati e Nobiltà civiche [Kingdom of Naples, Patriciates and civic Nobilities] (Paperback) (in Italian). Vol. II. Naples (NA). pp. 29/LXXIII.
- Luigi Volpicella (1648). Reame di Napoli, Patriziati e Nobiltà civiche [Kingdom of Naples, Patriciates and civic Nobilities] (Paperback) (in Italian). Vol. IV. Naples (NA). pp. 100/XXXIII.
- Gaetano Montefuscoli (1780). "IV" [IV]. Imprese ovvero Stemmi delle Famiglie italiane [Companies or coats of arms of Italian families] (Paperback) (in Italian). Naples (NA). p. 100.
- Francesco Gammella (1834). Il muto per Napoli, ossia Le mille e quattrocento strade, vichi ecc. reperibili da tutti opera compilata da Francesco D. V. [The silent era for Naples, or The thousand and four hundred streets, alleys etc. available to all, work compiled by Francesco D. V.] (Paperback) (in Italian). F. Gammella.
- Luigi Cangiano (1843). "Parte Prima-Origine, amministrazione, distribuzione ed uso delle acque potabili della Città di Napoli" [Part One-Origin, administration, distribution and use of drinking water in the City of Naples]. In typography of L'Aquila by V. Puzziello (ed.). Su le acque pubbliche potabili della citta di Napoli e de' modi di aumentarle memoria di Luigi Cangiano [On the public drinking waters of the city of Naples and the ways of increasing them, memory of Luigi Cangiano] (Paperback) (in Italian). Vol. 1. tipografia dell'Aquila di V. Puzziello. pp. 12, 13, 14 and 15.
- Catello Parisi (1842). "Matrimoni Nobili, Zurolo" [Noble Weddings, Zurolo]. Cenno storico-descrittivo della città di Castellammare di Stabia contenente la sua indicazione, le notizie dell'antica e nuova Stabia, il suo stato attuale ed un'appendice di utili nozioni che la risguardano per C. Parisi [Historical-descriptive note of the city of Castellammare di Stabia containing its indication, information on the ancient and new Stabia, its current state and an appendix of useful information regarding it for C. Parisi] (Paperback) (in Italian). Florence (FI). p. 99.
- Gaetano Caporale (1890). stable. typ. N. Jovene and Company (ed.). Memorie storico-diplomatiche della città di Acerra e dei conti che la tennero in feudo corredate di riscontri tra la storia civile e la feudale della Campanìa, Salvatore Zurolo Gran Siniscalco... Giovanni Zurolo Conte di Sant'Angelo [Historical-diplomatic memories of the city of Acerra and of the counts who held it as a fief accompanied by comparisons between the civil and feudal history of Campania, Salvatore Zurolo Grand Seneschal... Giovanni Zurolo Count of Sant'Angelo] (Paperback) (in Italian). Naples (NA). pp. 274 and 368.
- Gino Doria (1979). R. Ricciardi (ed.). Le strade di Napoli saggio di toponomastica storica [The streets of Naples essay on historical toponymy] (Paperback) (in Italian). R. Ricciardi. pp. 75 and 483.
- Salvatore Di Giacomo; R. Marrone (1995). "Il Fatto del Vico Zuroli" [The Vico Zuroli Fact]. In R. Marrone (ed.). Napoli: figure e paesi. Luci e ombre napoletane [Naples: figures and countries. Neapolitan lights and shadows] (Paperback) (in Italian). Rome (RM): Grandi Tascabili Economici Newton. p. 96. ISBN 9788879839792.
- Biblioteca dell'"Archivum romanicum.", Storia, letteratura, paleografia · Volumi 264–265 [Library of the "Archivum romanicum.", History, literature, paleography · Volumes 264-265] (Paperback) (in Italian). L. S. Olschki. 1995. ISBN 978-88-222-4365-2.
- Gennaro Zurolo (2024). "Capitolo V, parte I - Monumenti e dimore storiche (roccheforti, castelli, manieri e palazzi) che hanno ospitato personaggi della Casata Albero genealogico illustrato" [Chapter V, Part I - Monuments and historic residences (fortresses, castles, manors, and palaces) that hosted members of the House. Illustrated family tree.]. Casata Zurolo. Origini e sviluppo di una famiglia feudale del Meridione d'Italia [Zurolo House. Origins and development of a feudal family from Southern Italy] (Paperback) (in Italian). pp. 131, 132, 133 and 134.

=== Archival sources ===
- Cesare D'Engenio Caracciolo; Carlo De Lellis (1654). Napoli Sacra-Que oltre le vere origini, e fundationi di tutte le Chiese, Monasterij, Cappelle, Spedali, e d'altri luoghi sacri della Città di Napoli, e de' suoi Borghi. Si tratta di tutti i Corpi, e Reliquie de' Santi .... Parte Seconda O' vero Svpplimento A Napoli Sacra Di D. Cesare D'Engenio Caracciolo Del Signor Carlo De Lellis, Que si aggiungono Le Fondationi Di Tvtte Le Chiese, Monasteri, & altri luoghi Sacri della Città di Napoli e suoi Borghi, ereti doppo dell'Engenio, Con Le Loro Inscrittioni, Et Epitafii, Reliquie, e Corpi di Santi, & altre opere pie, che vi si fanno, E con altre cose notabili. 2 [Sacred Naples beyond the true origins and foundations of all the Churches, Monasteries, Chapels, Hospitals, and other sacred places of the City of Naples and its villages. It deals with all the Bodies and Relics of the Saints.... Part Two O' True Development In Sacred Naples By D. Cesare D'Engenio Caracciolo By Signor Carlo De Lellis, Which Adds The Foundations Of All The Churches, Monasteries, & other sacred places of the city of Naples and its villages, erected after the Engenio, with their inscriptions, and epitaphs, relics, and bodies of saints, & other pious works, which are done there, and with other notable things. 2] (Ancient book) (in Italian). p. 21.
- Carlo De Lellis (1654). in the printing house of Honofrio Sauio, Italian language (ed.). Discorsi delle famiglie nobili del Regno di Napoli del signor Carlo De Lellis. Parte prima [-terza], Volume 1 [Speeches of the noble families of the Kingdom of Naples by Mr. Carlo De Lellis. Part one [-third], Volume 1] (Ancient book) (in Italian). Vol. 1. Naples (NA). pp. 359 to 368.
- Carlo De Lellis (1654). Discorsi Delle Famiglie Nobili Del Regno Di Napoli, Volume 2 [Speeches of the Noble Families of the Kingdom of Naples, Volume 2] (Ancient book) (in Italian). Vol. 2. Naples (NA): Savio. pp. 19, 21, 22 and 23.
- Carlo De Lellis (1654). "Famiglia Boccapianola" [Boccapianola family]. Famiglie nobili del regno di Napoli [Noble families of the kingdom of Naples] (Ancient book) (in Italian). Vol. 1. Forni. p. 361.
- Biagio Aldimari (1691). "FAMIGLIE NOBILI, cap. Della Famiglia Boccapianola" [NOBLE FAMILIES, chap. Of the Boccapianola family]. Memorie historiche di diverse famiglie nobili [Historical memoirs of several noble families] (Ancient book) (in Italian). G. Raillard. p. 224.
- Carlo Celano; et al. (Salvatore Palermo) (1792). Delle notizie del bello, dell'antico, e del curioso della citta di Napoli, per gli signori forastieri, raccolte dal canonico Carlo Celano napoletano; divise in dieci giornate, .. Giornata terza · Volume 3 [Of the news of the beautiful, the ancient, and the curious of the city of Naples, for foreign gentlemen, collected by the Neapolitan Canon Carlo Celano; divided into ten days, .. Day three · Volume 3] (Ancient book) (in Italian). Vol. 3. Naples (NA). p. 220.
- Pietro Giannone; et al. (Provincial Library, Topographical Office) (1833). Istoria civile del Regno di Napoli di Pietro Giannone con annotazioni 1 [Civil history of the Kingdom of Naples by Pietro Giannone with annotations 1] (Ancient book) (in Italian). Nicolò Bettoni e Comp. p. 618.

=== Secondary sources ===
- Donatella Mazzoleni (1999). Palazzi di Napoli [Palaces of Naples] (Paperback) (in Italian). Arsenale. ISBN 9788877432193.
- Miscellanea Napoletana (2021). Miscellanea Napoletana [Neapolitan miscellany] (Paperback) (in Italian). Edizioni Finoia. p. 137. ISBN 9788832180091.

=== Yearbooks ===
- Istituto nazionale delle assicurazioni (1834). Detken & Rocholl (ed.). Annuario Detken guida amministrativa, commerciale, industriale e professionale della città e provincia di Napoli [Detken yearbook administrative, commercial, industrial and professional guide of the city and province of Naples] (Yearbook) (in Italian). Naples (NA): Detken & Rocholl. pp. 57, 109, 391, 405, 467, 635, 709, 742, 1066, 1130, 1208, 1222, 1227, 1242, 1245, 1371, 1311, 1399, 1426, 1431, 1446, 1508, 1552 and 1529.

=== Newspaper articles ===
- Mario Giobbe (6 August 1898). "La farsa di Vico Zuroli" [The farce of Vico Zuroli]. Corriere di Napoli (Newspaper articles). The article talks about the case of the false seer of Vico, and Vicoletto, of the Zuroli. Naples (NA).
