= Cassano Irpino =

- Comune
- Comune di Cassano Irpino
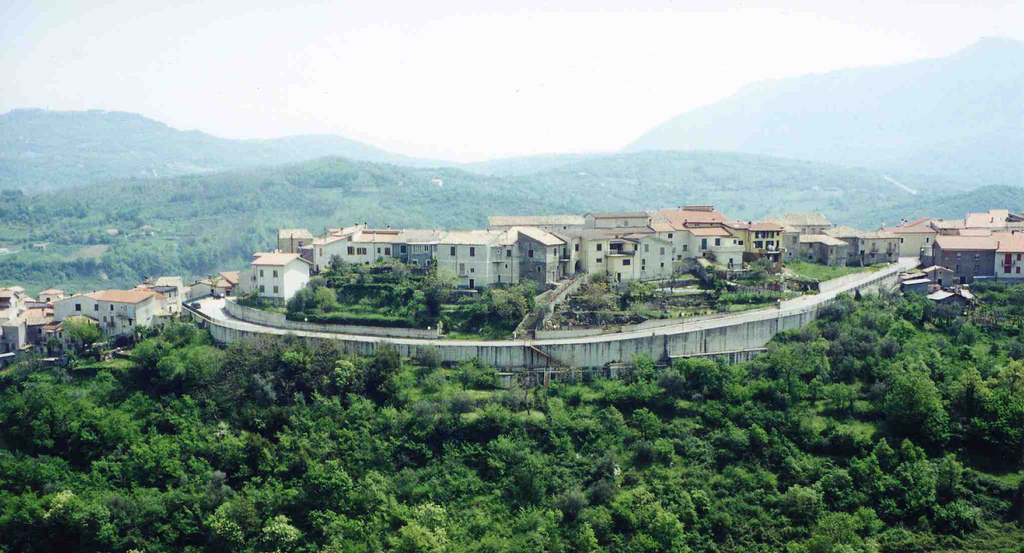

- Coat of arms

- Location within Italy Location within Campania
- Coordinates: 40°52′17″N 15°1′36″E
- Country: Italy
- Region: Campania
- Province: Avellino (AV)

Government
  - Mayor: Salvatore Vecchia

Area
  - Total: 12.33 km^{2} (4.76 sq mi)
- Elevation: 510 m (1,670 ft)

Population (31 December 2017)
  - Total: 964
  - Density: 78.2/km^{2} (202/sq mi)
- Demonym: Cassanesi
- Time zone: UTC+1 (CET)
  - Summer (DST): UTC+2 (CEST)
- Postal code: 83040
- Dialing code: 0827
- Patron saint: St. Bartholomew the Apostle
- Saint day: 25 August
- Website: Official website

Cassano Irpino is a town and comune in the province of Avellino, Campania, southern Italy.
