= Caracciolo =

Caracciolo may refer to:

- House of Caracciolo, an aristocratic family from Naples, Italy
- Caracciolo (surname), an Italian surname
- Caracciolo, an opera by Franco Vittadini
- Francesco Caracciolo-class battleship, an Italian dreadnought battleship class

== See also ==
- Carracci
