= Zurolo =

Zurolo is an Italian surname.

== Variations ==
Zollino, Zorlino, Zullini, Zullo, Zurla, Zurli, Zurlini, Zurlino, Zurlo, Zuroli, Zurri, Zurro.

== Geographical distribution ==
As of 2014, among all known bearers of the surname Zurolo there were residents in various countries as follows: Italy (frequency 1:155,220), of United States of America (frequency 1:5,491,802), of Germany (frequency 1:8,945,051), of France (frequency 1:9,488,960), of Switzerland (frequency 1:1,368,819) and Netherlands (frequency 1:16,887,176).

== Origins and diffusion ==
Zollino is present in Apulia, in the Lecce area.

Zullini is a surname that is not very common in Italy. The region where it is most present is Veneto, then descending are: Lombardy, Piedmont, Lazio, Tuscany, and Marche.

Zullo is mostly present in the Campania region, on average in: Apulia, Molise, Sicily, Piedmont, Lombardy, Tuscany, Lazio and less in the rest of the other Italian regions, It also has a lineage in Messina.

Zurla is present in Emilia-Romagna and Lombardy, less in other Italian regions.

Zurli is mostly present in Tuscany, on average in Lazio, Lombardy, Umbria, Emilia-Romagna and Liguria, and to a lesser extent in other Italian regions. The countries where this surname is generally widespread are: Brazil, Argentina, France and Switzerland, less so in others.

Zurlino is present in the majority in the Molise region, followed by Abruzzo and Emilia-Romagna. The nations in which the surname is present, by intensity, are: Australia more than Italy, United States of America, Switzerland, Belgium, Brazil, Germany and Kenya.

Zurlo is present in Calabria, Campania, Lucania, Molise and Apulia (Brindisi, Lecce, Taranto) and others regions.

Zurolo is the archaic form of the surname Zurlo, it is very widespread in Castellammare di Stabia and in the Neapolitan hinterland area. It seems that the surname is very frequent in southern Italy, however, it also has a strain in the Padua area.

Zuroli is present only in the Basilicata region, with only a few families bearing this surname today.

Zurri is present only in Tuscany, Umbria, Piedmont and Liguria.

Zurro is present in: Apulia, Campania, Sicily, Friuli-Venezia Giulia, and on average in other regions.

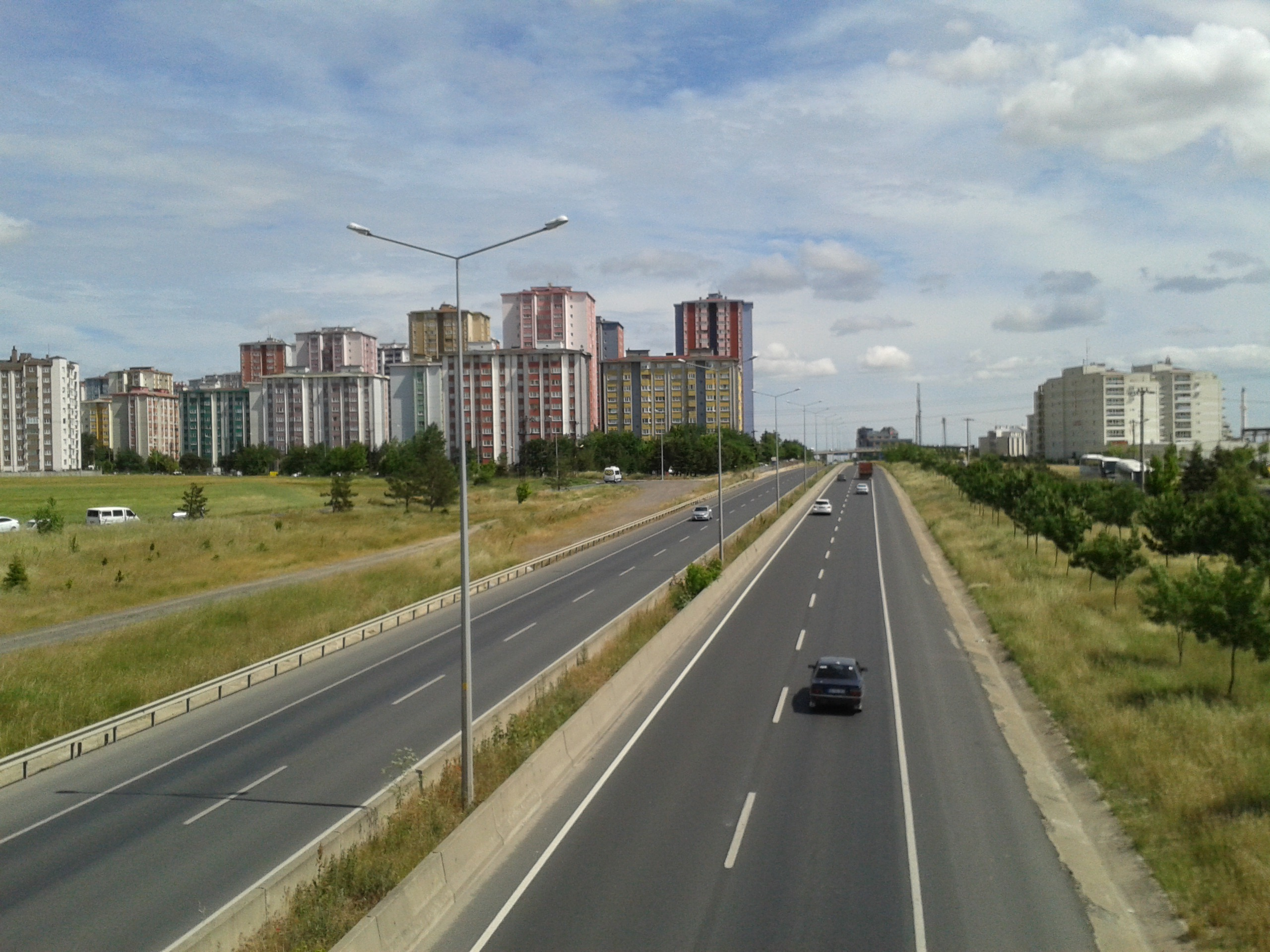
Partial view of the city of Çorlu, formerly called Syrallo-Tzurulos Çorlu, formerly Syrallo-Tzurulos (Zurulo-Zurolo).

== Meaning ==
Zollino is perhaps predical: from the Zurolo family (surname adapted to Zullo, Zullini, Zurlini: descendants of Zurolo and Zurlo).

Zullo could derive from the modified italian name of Giulio. According to some authoritative genealogists, the surname Zullo, from the Greek Tsulos, derives from an unknown progenitor of the Zullo family.

Zurla could derive from a Tuscan nickname, meaning noise. The Zurla family, the Cremonese branch of the Neapolitan Zurolo family, bore this variant of their surname, which then spread throughout that area of Lombardy, arriving in Cremona in the 12th century.

Zuroli is a plural form of the more common Zurolo, is associated with the Zurolo family. Zurli family, the Trieste branch of the Neapolitan Zurolo family bore this variant of the surname, which has been mentioned in Trieste since the 15th century.

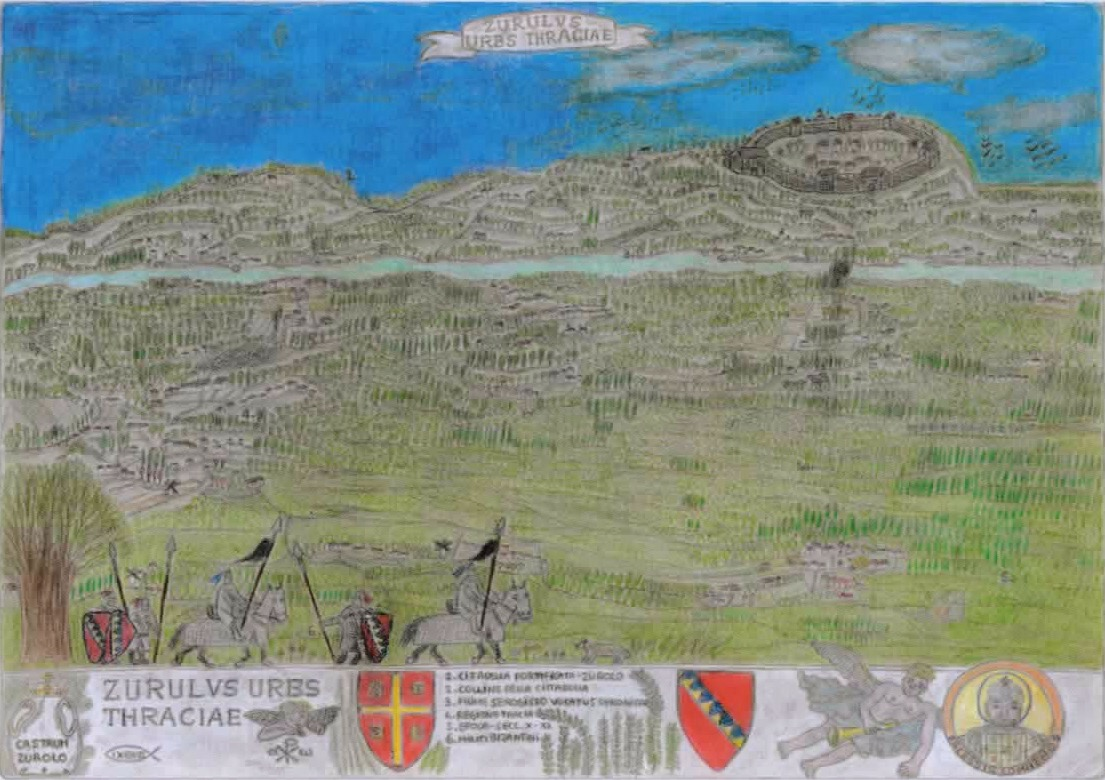
Hypothesis of perspective plan of the fortified city ZURULUS – URBS THRACIAE, 10th-11th centuries.

Zurlino is a surname derived from Zurolo and Zurlo, it has the same meanings.

Zurlo certainly originates from the Greek 'Zurlos' = crazy. n. m. [prob., dialect variant of girlo]. – In the Gorizia dialect it means silly or stupid. In the Venetian dialect, spinning top; fig., person of little brain, or reckless, escaped (with these uses fig., also to the feminine Zurla). Żurlo n. m. [der. of żurlare], ancient Tuscan – ruzzo, lively and noisy cheerfulness, desire to joke, and similar. The Zurlo family, a Calabrian branch of the Neapolitan Zurolo family, bore this variant of their surname and arrived in Crotone in the 14th century. Two other branches of the family with the same surname have been traced in Genoa in Liguria and in Giovinazzo in Puglia.

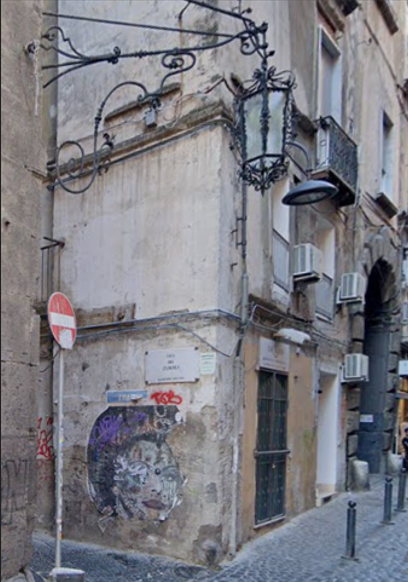
The historic residence of Zurolo family, also known as Zurlo family, seen (from left), located in Via dei Tribiunali, in Naples (NA), 14th-15th century, with a roadside plaque bearing Vico Zuroli, in fact the Vico and Vicoletto of Zuroli also take their name from the historic residence.

The surname Zurolo in some ancient texts also written in the Zurulus form, now obsolete and its derivation Zurlo could derive from modifications of the Greek name Ζωή (Zoe). Various authors of the past and modern researchers have noted that Zurolo or Zurlo (or Zullo) is the same as the Piscicello or Piscicelli family, whose House used on the shield the aforementioned fish-pisces, of black color called zullo or zurlo or zurolo (from the Greek zωή, zoe, meaning life; tsulos; from the Latin zullus, zurlus, zurulus, meaning to rise, to arise), then widespread in the sea of Otranto (where it possessed fiefs). Anciently transcribed in documents also in Latin in the variants of: Zurulo/Zurolo, Zurulum, Zurulus, Zurolos and Zurlos now disappeared. The surnames Zurolo could be of Greek origin and subsequently Italianised. The surname as the original toponym of a fortified town (formerly a Roman colony in Thrace), today Çorlu (Turkey). Çorlu, formerly Syrallo-Tzurulos (in Italian Zurulo-Zurolo), a locality in the province of Tekirdağ in Turkey. During Roman and Byzantine times, the town was referred to as Tzourolos, or Syrallo, and later became Tiroloi (in GreekΤυρολόη) (see Tabula Peutingeriana). Furthermore, the spelling Zurolus is used for the Latinised form of the name of the episcopal see identified with present-day Çorlu in the Catholic Church's list of titular sees. The first known document where the surname of the noble Zurolo family (also called Zurlo but also Zuroli or Zurlo or Zullo or Capece Zurolo/Zurlo or Zurolo d’Aprano or Aprano in this document and in others) appears transcribed is an Italian will from 1369.

Zuroli is the transcription of the surname Zurolo in the plural, in Naples, a city in southern Italy, between Via dei Tribunali and Via Vicaria Vecchia, in the Pendino district, there are two ancient alleys located in the historic center of the city, from which they take their name from the noble family who also had their noble palace there.

Zurri is a rare and widespread surname in northern Italy, it can mean joy.

Zurro, Żurro s. m. – ancient Tuscan variant of Żurlo: to catch in the act of frolicking, of having fun. It derive from a word of the Sicilian dialect or be more properly a variant of the surname Zurlo. It is an older voice than the one in Zurlo. It is similar to the surname Zumbo.

== People ==
Among the famous people with this surname, in chronological order, appear:

- Giovanni Zurolo, also called Giovanni Zurlo, in Latin Johannes Zurolo (*1382 †1440), he was a count, a feudal lord and a Useful Lord, of the Terra d'Angri, of Roccapiemonte and of other lands of the Kingdom of Naples; already a valiant leader.
- Francesco Zurolo, also called Francesco Zurlo, in some ancient transcriptions Francisci Zuroli or Francesco Zurulo (b. first half of the 15th century-d. Otranto, 11 August 1480), he was a baron of Oppido Lucano and feudal lord of Pietragalla and Casalaspro.
- Giuseppe Capece Zurlo, (1711–1801), he was an Italian cardinal who served as archbishop of Naples.
- Giuseppe Zurlo, (Baranello, 6 November 1757-Naples, 10 November 1828), he was an Italian jurist and politician.
- Placido Zurla, O.S.B. Cam., (2 April 1769 – 29 October 1834) was an Italian Camaldolese monk and prelate, who was Cardinal Vicar of Rome and a writer on medieval geography.
- Valerio Zurlini (Bologna, 19 March 1926 – Verona, 26 October 1982) was an Italian director and screenwriter.
- Franco Zurlo, (1940–2018), he was an Italian boxer.
- Mario Zurlini (17 March 1942 – 16 February 2023) was an Italian professional football player and manager.
- Emmanuele Zurlo, (Catanzaro, 27 February 1988), he was an Italian beach football player.
- Michael Anthony Zullo, (Brisbane, 11 September 1988), he was an Australian footballer of Italian origin, who played as a defender or midfielder.
- Federico Zurlo, (Cittadella, 27 February 1994), he is an Italian cyclist.

== See also ==
- Angri
- Baranello
- Çorlu
- Cremona
- Emmanuele Zurlo
- Federico Zurlo
- Francesco Zurolo
- Franco Zurlo
- Giovanni Zurolo
- Giovinazzo
- Giulio
- Giuseppe Capece Zurlo
- Giuseppe Zurlo
- House of Zurolo
- Kingdom of Naples
- Mario Zurlini
- Michael Anthony Zullo
- Naples
- Oppido Lucano
- Otranto
- Pietragalla
- Placido Zurla
- Tabula Peutingeriana
- Valerio Zurlini
- Via dei Tribunali
- Vico and Vicoletto of Zuroli
- Zumbo (surname)
- Zurla family

== Bibliography ==
=== Historical sources ===
- Count Berardo Candida-Gonzaga (1875). "ZURLO" [ZURLO]. Memorie delle famiglie nobili delle province meridionali d'Italia, Volume 2 [Memoirs of the noble families of the southern provinces of Italy, Volume 2] (Paperback) (in Italian). Vol. 2. Naples (NA): Cav. G. de Angelis and son's typical stab. p. 219.
- Luigi Palmieri; et al. (Illustrated by R. Biamonte) (October 1999). "ZURLO" [ZURLO]. Cosenza e le sue famiglie, attraverso testi, atti e manoscritti, Volume 1 [Cosenza and its families, through texts, deeds and manuscripts, Volume 1] (Paperback) (in Italian). Vol. 1. Cosenza (CS): LUIGI PELLEGRINI EDITORE. p. 536. ISBN 88-8101-067-4.
- Anna Komnene; et al. (Translator E. R. A. Sewter) (6 August 2009) [Circa 1148]. "Tzouroulos" [Tzouroulos]. The Alexiad [The Alexiad] (E-book). Penguin Books Limited. p. 242. ISBN 9780141904542.
- Gennaro Zurolo (2024). "Capitolo I, Memorie historiche, Capitolo V, parte I - Monumenti e dimore storiche (roccheforti, castelli, manieri e palazzi) che hanno ospitato personaggi della Casata Albero genealogico illustrato" [Chapter I, Historical Memories, Chapter V, Part I - Monuments and historic residences (fortresses, castles, manors, and palaces) that have hosted members of the House. Illustrated family tree.]. Casata Zurolo. Origini e sviluppo di una famiglia feudale del Meridione d'Italia [Casata Zurolo. Origins and development of a feudal family from Southern Italy] (Paperback) (in Italian). pp. 11, 12, 13, 14, 15, 16, 21 and 131.

=== Archival sources ===
- Cesare D'Engenio Caracciolo; Carlo De Lellis (1654). Napoli Sacra-Que oltre le vere origini, e fundationi di tutte le Chiese, Monasterij, Cappelle, Spedali, e d'altri luoghi sacri della Città di Napoli, e de' suoi Borghi. Si tratta di tutti i Corpi, e Reliquie de' Santi .... Parte Seconda O' vero Svpplimento A Napoli Sacra Di D. Cesare D'Engenio Caracciolo Del Signor Carlo De Lellis, Que si aggiungono Le Fondationi Di Tvtte Le Chiese, Monasteri, & altri luoghi Sacri della Città di Napoli e suoi Borghi, ereti doppo dell'Engenio, Con Le Loro Inscrittioni, Et Epitafii, Reliquie, e Corpi di Santi, & altre opere pie, che vi si fanno, E con altre cose notabili. 2 [Sacred Naples beyond the true origins and foundations of all the Churches, Monasteries, Chapels, Hospitals, and other sacred places of the City of Naples and its villages. It deals with all the Bodies and Relics of the Saints.... Part Two O' True Development In Sacred Naples By D. Cesare D'Engenio Caracciolo By Signor Carlo De Lellis, Which Adds The Foundations Of All The Churches, Monasteries, & other sacred places of the city of Naples and its villages, erected after the Engenio, with their inscriptions, and epitaphs, relics, and bodies of saints, & other pious works, which are done there, and with other notable things. 2] (Ancient book) (in Italian). p. 21.
- Carlo Celano; et al. (Salvatore Palermo) (1792). Delle notizie del bello, dell'antico, e del curioso della citta di Napoli, per gli signori forastieri, raccolte dal canonico Carlo Celano napoletano; divise in dieci giornate, .. Giornata terza · Volume 3 [Of the news of the beautiful, the ancient, and the curious of the city of Naples, for foreign gentlemen, collected by the Neapolitan Canon Carlo Celano; divided into ten days, .. Day three · Volume 3] (Ancient book) (in Italian). Vol. 3. Naples (NA). p. 220.

=== Dictionaries, encyclopedias, yearbook ===
- Giovanni Battista di Crollalanza (1886). "ZUZ" [ZUZ]. Dizionario storico-blasonico delle famiglie nobili e notabili italiane estinte e fiorenti, Volume 1 [Historical-blasonic dictionary of noble and notable Italian families, extinct and flourishing, Volume 1] (Dictionary) (in Italian). Vol. 1. At the direction of the Heraldic Journal. p. 129.
- Marquis Vittorio Spreti (1929). "LETTERA C" [LETTER C]. Enciclopedia storico-nobiliare italiana, Parte 2 [Italian historical-noble encyclopedia, Part 2] (Encyclopedia) (in Italian). Vol. 2 (2nd ed.). Milan (MI): UNIONE TIPOGRAFICA di Milano. p. 282.
- Michele Francipane (November 2005). "SECONDA PARTE, TERZA PARTE" [SECOND PART, THIRD PART]. Dizionario ragionato dei cognomi italiani [An annotated dictionary of Italian surnames] (Dictionary) (in Italian). Milan (MI): Biblioteca Universale Rizzoli. pp. 743, 744 and 976. ISBN 8817007641.
- Staff of Vatican Secretariat of State (2013) (2013). Annuario pontificio (2013) [Pontifical Yearbook (2013)] (Yearbook) (in Italian). Vatican City (VA): Vatican Publishing House. p. 1013. ISBN 9788820990701.

=== Newspaper articles ===
- Christian Seu (28 February 2014). "Non sapete cos'è lo "zurlo"? Leggetelo nel Gorizionario" [Don't know what "zurlo" is? Read it in the Gorizionario]. MessaggeroVeneto (Newspaper) (in Italian). Venice (VE): Nord Est Multimedia S.p.a.
