= Convent of Santa Maria del Gesù =

Church and convent in Oppido Lucano, Italy

Convent of Santa Maria del Gesù vulgo of Sant'Antonio
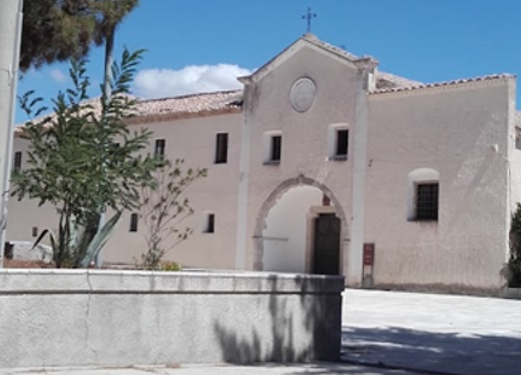
- Main entrance of the convent.
- Convent of Santa Maria del Gesù vulgo of Sant'Antonio
- 40°45′32″N 16°00′07″E
- Location: Oppido Lucano
- Address: State Road 19, nr. 35, between Oppido Lucano and Tolve
- Country: Italy
- Language: Italian

History
- Founded: 1482
- Founder(s): Francesco Zurolo founder (posthumously – after his death in 1480 and by his will, when he was still alive, he appointed his daughter Caterina Zurolo as executor) of the religious complex, consisting of the convent of Santa Maria del Gesù known as Sant'Antonio ad Oppido Lucano, in 1482
- Dedication: Anthony of Padua
- Other dedication: Mary

Architecture
- Style: Baroque

Administration
- Diocese: Archdiocese of Acerenza

The convent of Santa Maria del Gesù vulgo di Sant'Antonio, more simply called the convent of Sant'Antonio. It is a Christian religious complex of Catholic rite, with an adjoining homologous church, currently home to a community of minor friars (Franciscans), initially entitled to Santa Maria del Gesù and then to Sant'Antonio da Padova. It falls within the archdiocese of Acerenza.

The monastery was founded in 1482 on the initiative of Francesco Zurolo (posthumously and by testamentary will) and Caterina Zurolo (his daughter), lords of Oppido Lucano and other lands and fiefdoms. The complex is located approximately 1.5 km. from the town centre, along the road that connects Oppido Lucano with Tolve, a hamlet of the city of Oppido where the structure is located.

== History ==
=== The first news of the foundation of the convent ===
He was the founder of the convent complex – in 1480, who, when he was still alive, made a will and among other things issued a testamentary disposition, appointing his daughter Caterina Zurolo to carry out the construction work of a religious complex in Oppido Lucano after his death consisting of a convent (today known as Santa Maria del Gesù, then of Sant'Antonio) with the adjoining church of Sant'Antonio in Oppido Lucano; the aforementioned works began in 1482 as denoted by the foundation stone: "MCCCCLXXXII | FRANCISCO ZVRVLO | FECIT".

=== Other events ===
The convent was handed over to the Basilicata commissioner before 1484, to replenish the small number of convents in the possession of the Lucanian friars.

In 1593 it became the home of the reformed friars.

It was enlarged during the 17th century the convent quickly became one of the most important of the reform ones in the Lucanian province.

In 1851, a Novitiate under the title of Sacred Retreat of Oppido.

At the beginning of 1900, after the suppression of the religious orders carried out by the government of the young Kingdom of Italy, the convent regained its friars and the municipality of Oppido Lucano granted the building and the surrounding land for perpetual use to the friars minor of Basilicata.

== Description ==
=== The location of the convent and its internal composition ===
It is located about 1.5 km. away. from the town centre, along the road that connects Oppido Lucano with Tolve. At its entrance there is the foundation stone of the convent, still visible and intact. There is an internal church consisting of two naves, with an ancient seventeenth-century organ still functioning. The convent has two cloisters inside and there is also a library with over 5000 volumes.

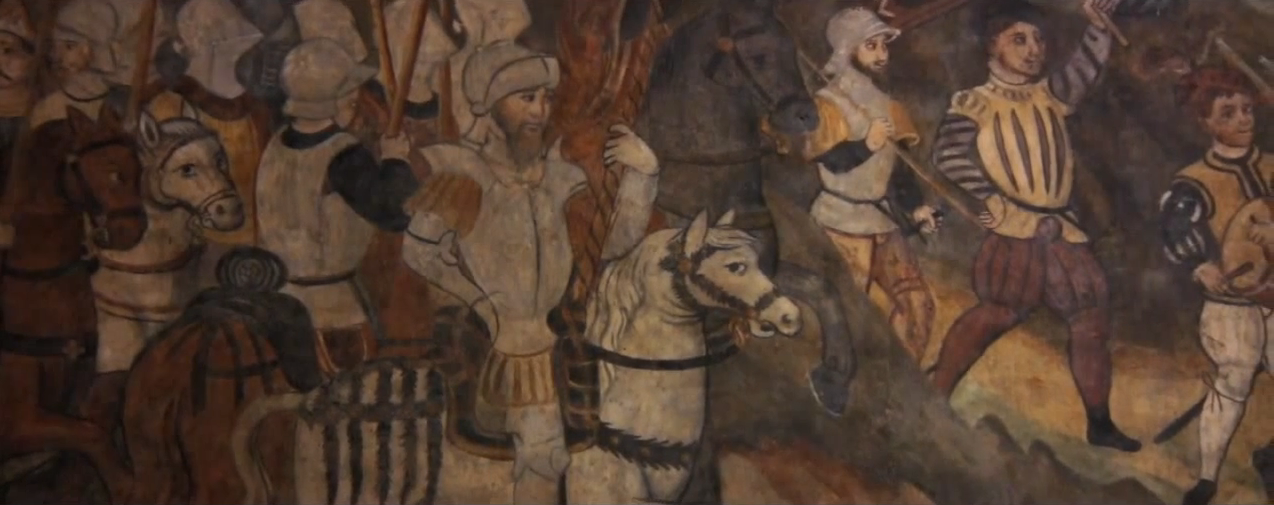
Detail of a fresco painted by the Italian artist Giovanni Todisco, part of the episode of Judith and Holofernes.

=== Artistic works preserved inside ===
The convent houses a picture gallery with restored works created between the beginning of the 17th and the end of the 18th century and a library with over 5000 volumes.

The church houses a 17th century organ, with original pipes still functioning. The choir is made of wood and carved, it is fire-dated to 1547 with inlaid panels dating back to the early 1400s, probably coming from the Abbey of Sant'Angelo del Bosco, an abbey destroyed by the earthquake of 1456.

Inside there are a polyptych and a triptych by Antonio Stabile da Potenza, with numerous canvases and panels, dating back to around 1560–70.

In around 1611 Giovanni Todisco created on the north side of the cloister of the convent, where there are three communicating rooms, some tempera murals arranged on opposite lunettes and depicting the story of Saint Francis of Assisi, the Franciscan saints and the birth of Jesus.

In 1980, a bronze door was created by Father Tarcisio Manta, on which some miracles of Saint Anthony and his death are depicted.

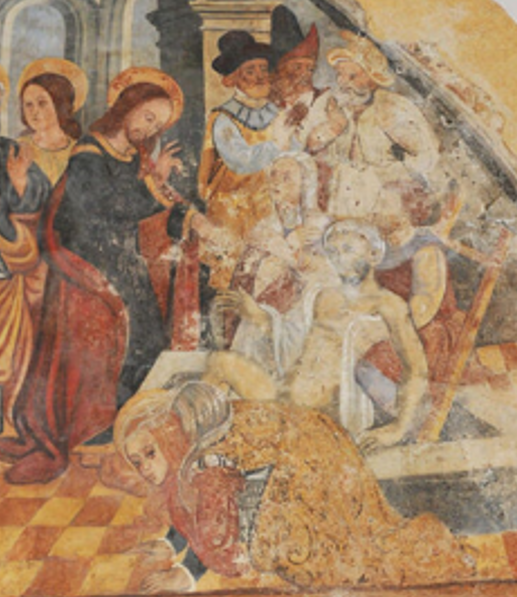
Detail of a fresco depicting the noble Baroness Caterina Zurolo, kneeling before Jesus Christ.

=== Restorations ===
In 1973, restoration work was carried out on the convent and some wall paintings by Giovanni Todisco were found.

=== The new renovations and redevelopment works of the convent ===
In February 2023, the mayor of the municipality of Oppido Lucano established an ordinance with which he sanctioned a redevelopment work of the convent structure to make it become a welcoming place for cultural and musical events once the works are completed.

== Dedications ==
- In one of the internal rooms of the convent of Santa Maria del Gesù known as Sant'Antonio, in Oppido Lucano, there is a fresco created by the Italian artist Giovanni Todisco, around 1611, depicting the baron and knight Francesco Zurolo with the halberd held in right hand and with a scroll in the left, he wears late medieval plate armor and helmet.
- There is a particular fresco in which Jesus Christ is represented blessing various characters Jesus Christ is depicted blessing various characters from the early medieval era, at his feet there are two female figures, the lower one in orange and red clothes of an early medieval baroness is represented by Caterina Zurolo.

== See also ==
- Abbey
- Anthony of Padua
- Archdiocese of Acerenza
- Baron
- Basilicata
- Catholic particular churches and liturgical rites
- Fief
- Franciscans
- Francis of Assisi
- Francesco Zurolo
- Fresco
- House of Zurolo
- Middle Ages
- Novitiate
- Lord
- Oppido Lucano
- Polyptych
- Scroll
- Testator
- Tolve
- Triptych

== Bibliography ==
=== Historical sources ===
- Francesco Giannone (1905). Memorie storiche statuti e consuetudini dell' antica Terra di Oppido in Basilicata [Historical memories, statutes and customs of the ancient Land of Oppido in Basilicata] (in Italian). Fratelli Marsala. pp. 167 and 178.
- Adriano Prandi (1964). Arte in Basilicata [Art in Basilicata] (in Italian). Milano (MI).
- Luigi Kalby (1977). Iconografia della Madonna tra Riforma e Controriforma in Lucania [Iconography of the Madonna between the Reformation and Counter-Reformation in Lucania] (in Italian). Vol. 1. Matera (MT). p. 555.
- Franco Noviello (1977–1978). La pittura lucana nel Quattrocento e nel Cinquecento [Lucanian painting in the fifteenth and sixteenth centuries] (in Italian). pp. 62 and 72.
- Francesco Saverio Lioi (1980). Oppido Lucano tra storia e preistoria (Note archeologiche, storiche e culturali su Oppido Lucano) [Oppido Lucano between history and prehistory (Archaeological, historical and cultural notes on Oppido Lucano)] (in Italian). Potenza (PZ). pp. 81 and 82.
- Amerigo Restucci (1981). Itinerari per la Basilicata [Itineraries for Basilicata] (in Italian). Vicenza (VI).
- Francesco Noviello (1985). Storiografia dell'arte pittorica popolare in Lucania e nella Basilicata: cultura figurativa popolare [Historiography of popular pictorial art in Lucania and Basilicata: popular figurative culture] (in Italian). Venosa (PZ): Osanna Edizioni. ISBN 9788881674411.
- Giuseppe Greco (January 1998). Oltre La Memoria. Momenti di vita della parrocchia SS. Pietro e Paolo in oppido lucano [Beyond Memory. Moments of life of the parish of SS. Peter and Paul in the Lucanian Oppidus.] (in Italian). Lavello (PZ): Arti Grafiche. pp. 252 and following.
- Francesca Filippi (29 May 2015). Matera e la Basilicata [Matera and Basilicata] (E-book) (in Italian). Palermo (PA): Lonely Planet. ISBN 9788859208099.
- Gennaro Zurolo (2021). "Il capitano Francesco Zurolo detto Zurlo" [Captain Francesco Zurolo known as Zurlo]. L'Assedio di Otranto del 1480 e i suoi prodi capitani: Francesco Zurolo detto Zurlo e Giovanni Antonio Delli Falconi [The Siege of Otranto in 1480 and its brave captains: Francesco Zurolo known as Zurlo and Giovanni Antonio Delli Falconi] (in Italian). Nola (NA). pp. 55, 56 and 57.
- Gennaro Zurolo (2024). "Capitolo IV - Ritratti di personaggi della Casata, Capitolo V, parte II - Monumenti e dimore storiche (roccheforti, castelli, manieri e palazzi) che hanno ospitato personaggi della Casata Albero genealogico illustrato" [Chapter IV - Portraits of members of the House, Chapter V, Part II - Monuments and historic residences (fortresses, castles, manors, and palaces) that have hosted members of the House. Illustrated family tree.]. Casata Zurolo. Origini e sviluppo di una famiglia feudale del Meridione d'Italia [Zurolo House. Origins and development of a feudal family from Southern Italy] (in Italian). pp. 112, 171, 172, 173 and 174.

=== Archival sources ===
- Bishop Francesco Gonzaga (1587). De origine Seraphicae Religionis Franciscanorum, de progressu, de regulari Observantia instauratione, de propagatione formarum administrationis ac legum, deque mira propagatione... F. F. G. opus, Volume 1 [On the origin of the Seraphic Religion of the Franciscans, on its progress, on the establishment of regular Observance, on the propagation of forms of administration and laws, and on the wonderful propagation... F. F. G. opus, Volume 1] (in Latin). Vol. 1 (1 ed.). Rome (RM).
- Bishop Francesco Gonzaga (1587). De Origine Seraphica Religionis Frâciscanæ, ejusque progressibus, de Regularis Observâciæ institutione, formâ administrationis ac legibus, admirabilique ejus propagatione F. F. G. ... opus, Volume 2 [On the origin of the Seraphic Religion of the Franciscans, on its progress, on the establishment of regular Observance, on the propagation of forms of administration and laws, and on the wonderful propagation... F. F. G. opus, Volume 2] (in Latin). Vol. 2 (1 ed.). Rome (RM).
- Father Luke Wadding (1934). Annales minorum seu trium ordinum a S. Francesco institorum [Annals of the minor" or of the three orders urged by St. Francis] (in Italian). Vol. Tome 22 (III ed.). Rome (RM). p. 122.

=== Secondary sources ===
==== Catalogues ====
- Anna Grelle (1981). Arte in Basilicata, rinvenimenti e restauri: [Catalogo della mostra], Palazzo del Seminario [Art in Basilicata, discoveries and restorations: [Exhibition catalogue], Palazzo del Seminario] (in Italian). Matera (MT): De Luca.

==== Publications ====
- Gianluigi Ciotta (1988). Oppido Lucano, Oppido Lucano, Convento di Sant'Antonio da Padova, in Insediamenti francescani in Basilicata, Ediz. Ministero Beni Culturali e Ambientali [Oppido Lucano, Oppido Lucano, Convent of Sant'Antonio da Padova, in Franciscan settlements in Basilicata, Ed. Ministry of Cultural and Environmental Heritage] (in Italian). Oppido Lucano (PZ): Italian Ministry of Cultural and Environmental Heritage. pp. 154 and 158.
- Nuccia Barbone Pugliese (1988). Oppido Lucano, chiostro del convento di Sant'Antonio: affreschi, in Insediamenti francescani in Basilicata, Ediz. Ministero Beni Culturali e Ambientali [Oppido Lucano, cloister of the convent of Sant'Antonio: frescoes, in Franciscan settlements in Basilicata, Ediz. Ministry of Cultural and Environmental Heritage] (in Italian). Oppido Lucano (PZ): Italian Ministry of Cultural and Environmental Heritage. pp. 154 and 158.
- Staff of the Basilicata Region (1999). Notizie della Regione Basilicata, in "Itinerari del sacro in terra lucana", Giovanni Todisco [News from the Basilicata Region, in "Itineraries of the sacred in Lucanian land", Giovanni Todisco] (PDF) (Nr. 92) (in Italian). Photo: Rossella Villani. pp. 239–242.
- Rosario Bianco (1999). Note sugli affreschi del convento di Oppido Lucano, in "Itinerari del sacro in terra lucana" in Basilicata Regione Notizie [Notes on the frescoes of the convent of Oppido Lucano, in "Itineraries of the sacred in Lucanian land" in Basilicata Region News] (in Italian). nr. 92. pp. 239–242.
- Rossella Villani (2000). "Il convento di Sant'Antonio a Oppido Lucano" [The convent of Sant'Antonio in Oppido Lucano]. Pittura murale in Basilicata, dal tardo antico al Rinascimento [Wall painting in Basilicata, from late antiquity to the Renaissance] (in Italian) (2 ed.). Regional Council of Basilicata. pp. 193–198.
- Soprintendenza per il patrimonio storico artistico e demo etnoantropologico per la Basilicata (Superintendency for the historical, artistic and ethno-anthropological heritage for Basilicata); et al. (Sabino Iusco) (2001). Anna Grelle Iusco (ed.). Arte in Basilicata [Art in Basilicata] (in Italian). De Luca. p. 299. ISBN 9788880164654.

==== Newspaper articles ====
- Giovanni Todisco; Rossella Villani. "Note sugli affreschi del convento di Oppido Lucano, Metà del '500-Il convento di Sant'Antonio ad Oppido Lucano" [Notes on the frescoes of the convent of Oppido Lucano, mid-16th century – The convent of Sant'Antonio in Oppido Lucano] (PDF). Conoscere la Basilicata (in Italian). 92: 239–242.
- Salvatore Sebaste. "Oppido Lucano" (PDF). Conoscere la Basilicata (in Italian): 4.

== Externals links ==
=== Officials sites ===
- Staff of Common of Oppido Lucano. "CONVENTO DI SANT'ANTONIO" [CONVENT OF SANT'ANTONIO]. Common of Oppido Lucano (in Italian). Oppido Lucano (PZ).
- Staff of Common of Oppido Lucano. "IL CONVENTO" [THE CONVENT]. Comune di Oppido Lucano (in Italian). Oppido Lucano (PZ): ProLoco di Oppido Lucano and Art BASILICATA.
- Staff of Catalogo Generale dei Beni Culturali (2006). "ARCHITRAVE DI PORTALE, (?) 1482 – (?) 1482" [PORTAL LINTEL, (?) 1482 – (?) 1482]. Catalogo generale dei Beni Culturali (in Italian). MIC-MINISTERO DELLA CULTURA ITALIANO.
- Staff of Catalogo Generale dei Beni Culturali (2020). "Convento S. Antonio-DIOCESI DI ACERANZA, 1482" [Convent of S. Antonio – DIOCESE OF ACERANZA, 1482]. Catalogo generale dei Beni Culturali (in Italian). MIC-ITALIAN MINISTRY OF CULTURE.
- Staff of FAI-FONDO PER L'AMBIENTE ITALIANO. "CONVENTO DI S.MARIA DEL GESU', DETTO DI S. ANTONIO-OPPIDO LUCANO, POTENZA" [CONVENT OF S. MARIA DEL GESU', KNOWN OF S. ANTONIO-OPPIDO LUCANO, POTENZA]. FAI-FONDO PER L'AMBIENTE ITALIANO (in Italian).
- Staff of PATRIMONIO CULTURALE INTANGIBILE DELLA BASILICATA. "Convento di Sant'Antonio ad Oppido Lucano" [Convent of Sant'Antonio in Oppido Lucano]. PATRIMONIO CULTURALE INTANGIBILE DELLA BASILICATA (in Italian). Basilicata region.

=== Other ===
- Staff of Visita la Lucania (2000). "Convento di S. Antonio (Oppido Lucano)" [Convent of S. Antonio (Oppido Lucano)]. Visita la Lucania (in Italian). Oppido Lucano (PZ).
- Redazione; Rossella Villani (24 April 2024). "Il convento di Sant'Antonio ad Oppido Lucano" [The convent of Sant'Antonio in Oppido Lucano]. Talenti Luacani – Passaggio a Sud (in Italian). Basilicata region.
