= Francesco Zurolo =

Italian feudal lord and baron (died 1480)

- Francesco Zurolo
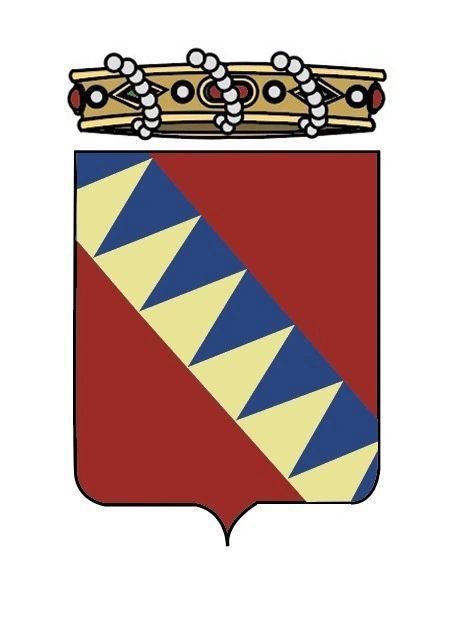

Leadership
- Captain: Otranto garrison

Related articles
- History: Francesco Zurolo (or Francesco Zurlo) was an Italian feudal lord, baron and Italian leader. He fought as a captain and was a military leader until his death, which occurred during the early stages of the war of the Ottoman conquest of Otranto, of the same. Founder (posthumously – after his death in 1480 and by his will, when he was still alive, he appointed his daughter Caterina Zurolo executor) of the religious complex, consisting of the Convent of Santa Maria del Gesù known as Sant'Antonio ad Oppido Lucano, in 1482.
- Ranks: Captain

Francesco Zurolo, also called Francesco Zurlo, in some ancient transcriptions Francisci Zuroli or Francesco Zurulo (first half of the 15th century – Otranto, 11 August 1480), he was an Italian baron of Oppido Lucano and feudal lord of Pietragalla and Casalaspro (it was a village that arose near Pietragalla).

He was a member of the noble Zurolo family.

He was also the military leader and captain of the city of Otranto, together with Giovanni Antonio Delli Falconi, during the siege of the Ottoman Turks, during the early stages of the Ottoman conquest of the city; he died heroically with his soldiers shortly after a breach in the walls, where he was killed by the Turkish soldiers.

By his will, he was the posthumous founder of the convent complex of Santa Maria del Gesù known as Sant'Antonino in Oppido Lucano and also by the will of one of his daughters, Caterina Zurolo, who fulfilled the wishes of her father after he died in battle. The complex was built in 1482.

== Biography ==
=== Zurolo family ===
The chronicle of the Zurolo family has been recorded since the earliest times and has enjoyed, with varying fortunes, nobility in the Kingdom of Naples and in particular in Campania, Apulia, Salento (a province of Apulia), Basilicata, and Molise.

=== Personal life in the Kingdom of Naples ===
Francesco Zurolo was the son of Giacomo Zurolo and Francesca Brancaccio. He had brothers and sisters, among whom were: Caterina, Ettore, Beatrice, Pietro, Elisabetta and Lucrezia.

Zurolo married Cassandra Caracciolo, with whom he had three daughters: Lucrezia, Caterina, and Ughetta.

Zurolo was feudal lord and baron of Pietragalla, Casalaspro, a village that arose near Pietragalla, and Oppido Lucano.

== War of Otranto ==
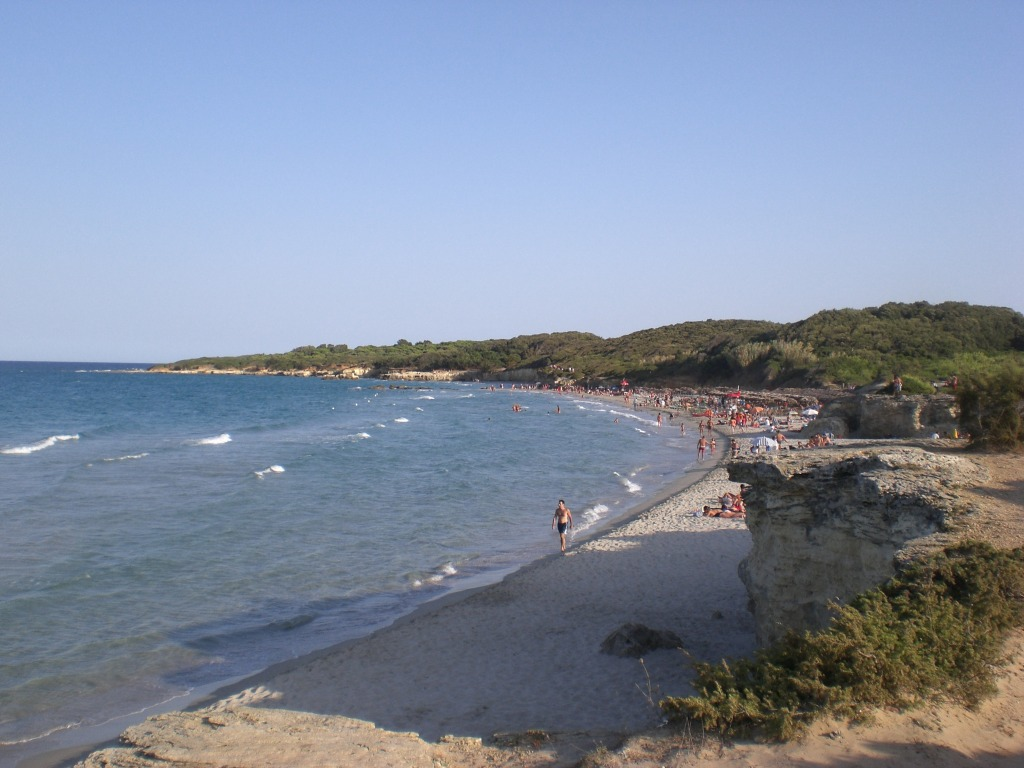
Pictured here is the southern part of Baia dei Turchi, near the Alimini Lakes in Apulia, where the waters are shallower; this is where Gedik Ahmed Pasha's first Ottoman invasion troops landed. It is located a few kilometers north of Otranto and is currently protected by the FAI.

=== Background to the War of Otranto ===
During the Ottoman Empire's period of expansion, Mehmed II shortly after conquering Constantinople, decided to invade the Christian kingdoms of Western Europe. Between 1476 and 1478, various Turkish forces were sent into northern Italy, including raids into Friuli-Venezia Giulia and Istria, then part of the dominions of the Republic of Venice. Peace was then established between the two nations in 1479.

Between May and August 1480, a new Turkish fleet was sent to conquer the island of Rhodes and the Southern Sporades, led by Gedik Ahmed Pasha. The Knights of St. John, however, managed to repel the siege, and the invading army was forced to retreat again.

Despite the various failures of the Ottoman forces, a new army of Turkish soldiers almost immediately set out from the Albanian coastal city of Vlorë and landed in Apulia.

In anticipation of the Ottoman invasion of Apulia, Zurolo was appointed by Ferrante of Aragon (commonly called Ferdinand I of Naples) as commander of the square (or commander of the garrison) of the city of Otranto, together with another captain, Giovanni Antonio Delli Falconi, who brought with him a handful of his most faithful followers from the city of Pulsano.

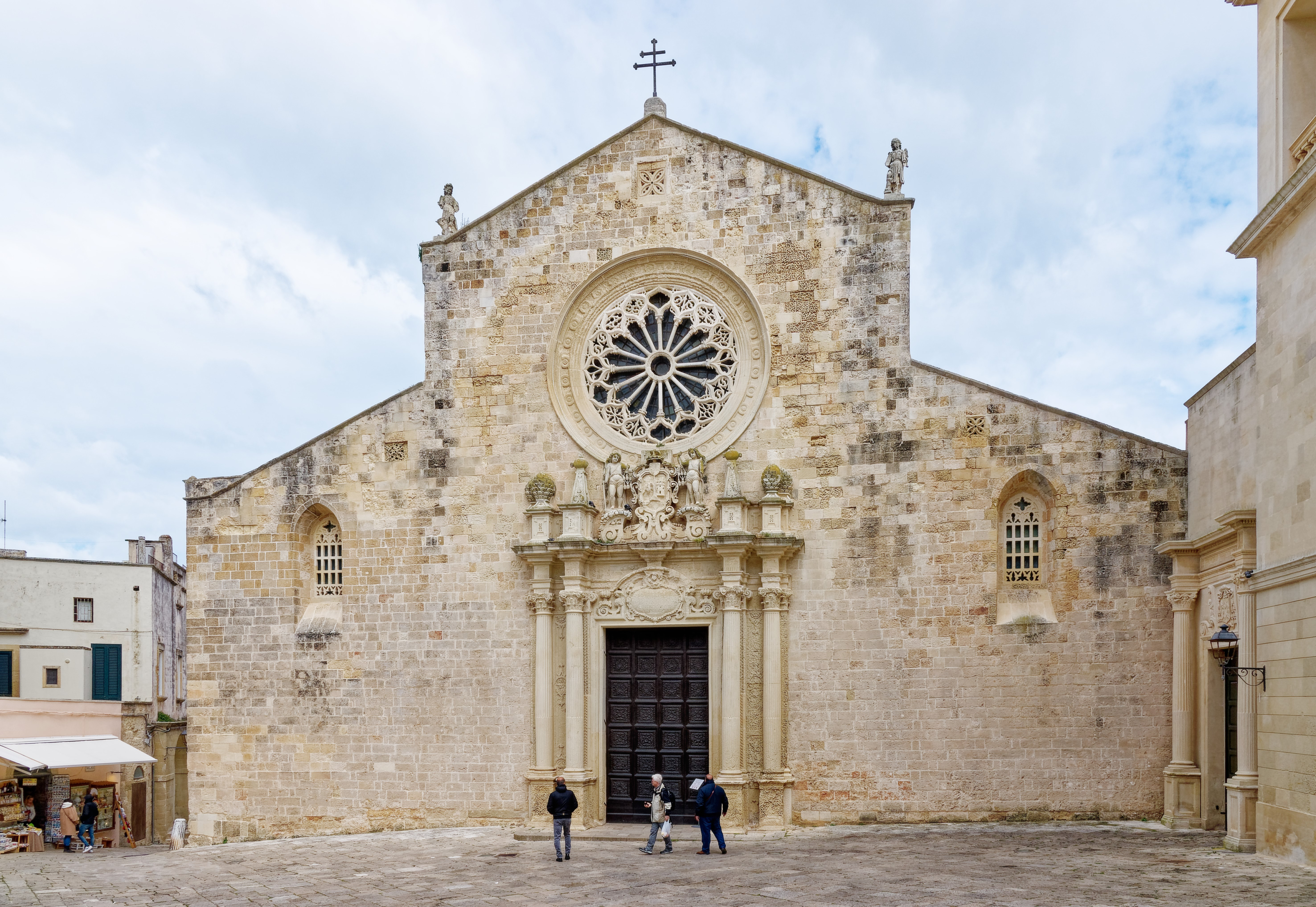
The facade of the cathedral basilica of Santa Maria Annunziata, where the Otrantines took refuge during the Turkish siege, was violated by the attackers after the capture, with the destruction of the sacred frescoes except that of the Madonna, which once deconsecrated was transformed into a mosque. In 1481, after the liberation of Otranto by the troops of Alfonso, Duke of Calabria, in 1482 it was extensively remodeled and the facade rebuilt.

=== The Turkish invasion of Apulia and Otranto ===
At the end of July 1480, the invasion of Apulia was supposed to take place near Bari or Brindisi. The invaders landed in an area near the Alimini Lakes, now called Baia dei Turchi, in memory of that invasion. The invading army was supposed to besiege the city of Brindisi but the Turkish commander, warned of the weak defenses in Otranto, preferred to attack the latter coastal city.

Otranto was invaded on Friday, in the early hours of 28 July, by about 18,000 Turks, led by Gedik Ahmed Pasha, composed of an army of 150 warships, divided into: 90 galleys, 15 maones, 40 schooners and other ships, with them also the agha of the janissaries and the bailo of Negroponte. The defending army had at its disposal about 5.000 men, practically all the inhabitants of the city, poorly armed, and a small group of mercenaries (there were about 300 Spanish mercenaries and 50 Italian knights) all commanded by Captain Francesco Zurolo, finally there were few and antiquated weapons at their disposal and an obsolete defensive system.

On 29 July, near the village near the city, the first looting began and subsequently the first clashes with the soldiers of the Otrantina garrison, who almost immediately gave the order to abandon it and retreat with the provisions (foodstuffs of various kinds) inside the fortification, whose doors were then closed to the enemy.

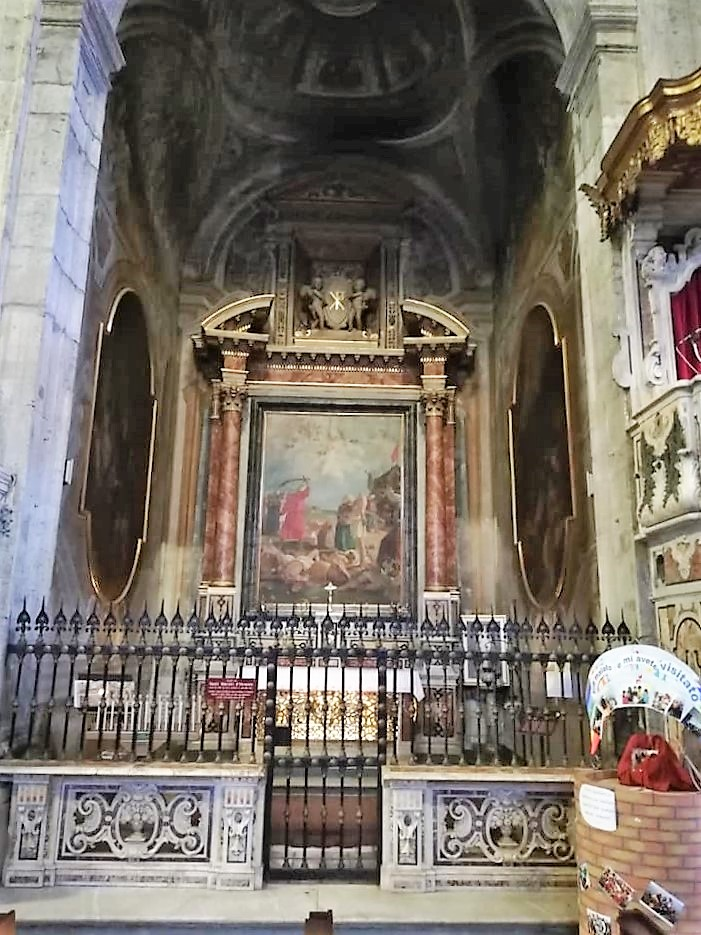
In the fourth chapel on the left, called the chapel of the Blessed Martyrs of Otranto, in the church of Santa Caterina in Forniello, are the remains of the martyrs of Otranto, transferred under the altar, between 1900 and 1901. The work depicts the martyrdom of the 813 Otrantines, edited by the Lecce painter Luigi Scorrano, taken from the painting by Giovanni Bellini, commissioned by Mehmed II, known as the Conqueror.

=== Failed diplomacy ===
Ahmet sent several mediators to ask for the surrender of Otranto, but the people rose up against the first mediator who avoided lynching, a certain Turcman or Turciman: a citizen of Otranto out of contempt threw the keys of the city on the seashore; other sources state that in reality it was the two captains who threw the keys into the well of the city, after having refused the diplomatic offer of unconditional surrender. Other mediators managed to escape death and communicated to the Pasha the refusal of Otranto to convert and surrender. Another messenger, perhaps the bearer of an ultimatum, did not even manage to get close to Otranto because he was pierced by an arrow at the gates of the city.

It seems that Gedik himself approached the walls of Otranto with a ship, but was almost killed by a cannon shot, exploded with orders from commander Zurolo.

=== Attack of Otranto ===
Between August 3 and 4, various letters and reports regarding the Turkish attack on Otranto reached both Vatican City and the Duchy of Milan, causing great dismay.

Ahmed Pasha, after having failed all diplomatic attempts, gave the order to bombard the enemy walls for 3 days, on 9, 10 and 11 August, during which the walls were only slightly reinforced by the defenders.

During those days of the siege, nearly seven-eighths (350 soldiers) of the Otranto militia scaled the city walls and fled, along with a small number of other terrified citizens. The remaining fifty soldiers fought alongside the inhabitants who stayed behind, pouring boiling oil and water onto the Ottomans attempting to scale the ramparts under cannon fire.

Despite the Turks' vast numerical superiority, the defenders fought with courage and faith, encouraged by the commander himself. During these 3 days, the Turkish soldiers who were captured by the defenders were killed by slaughter, some hanged and others impaled, on the orders of Zurolo, to scare the attackers. The Turks then managed to break through the walls with their batteries and open a gap at a point, where the door called La Porticella was located. On the day of the last battle, when the invaders managed to open the breach (see siege) in the walls, despite having been seriously wounded in the arm during an assault the previous day, Francesco rushed armed together with his son and other brave men in an attempt to repel the invaders, dying shortly thereafter.

Giovanni Antonio Delli Falconi died the following day, still in defense of the city.

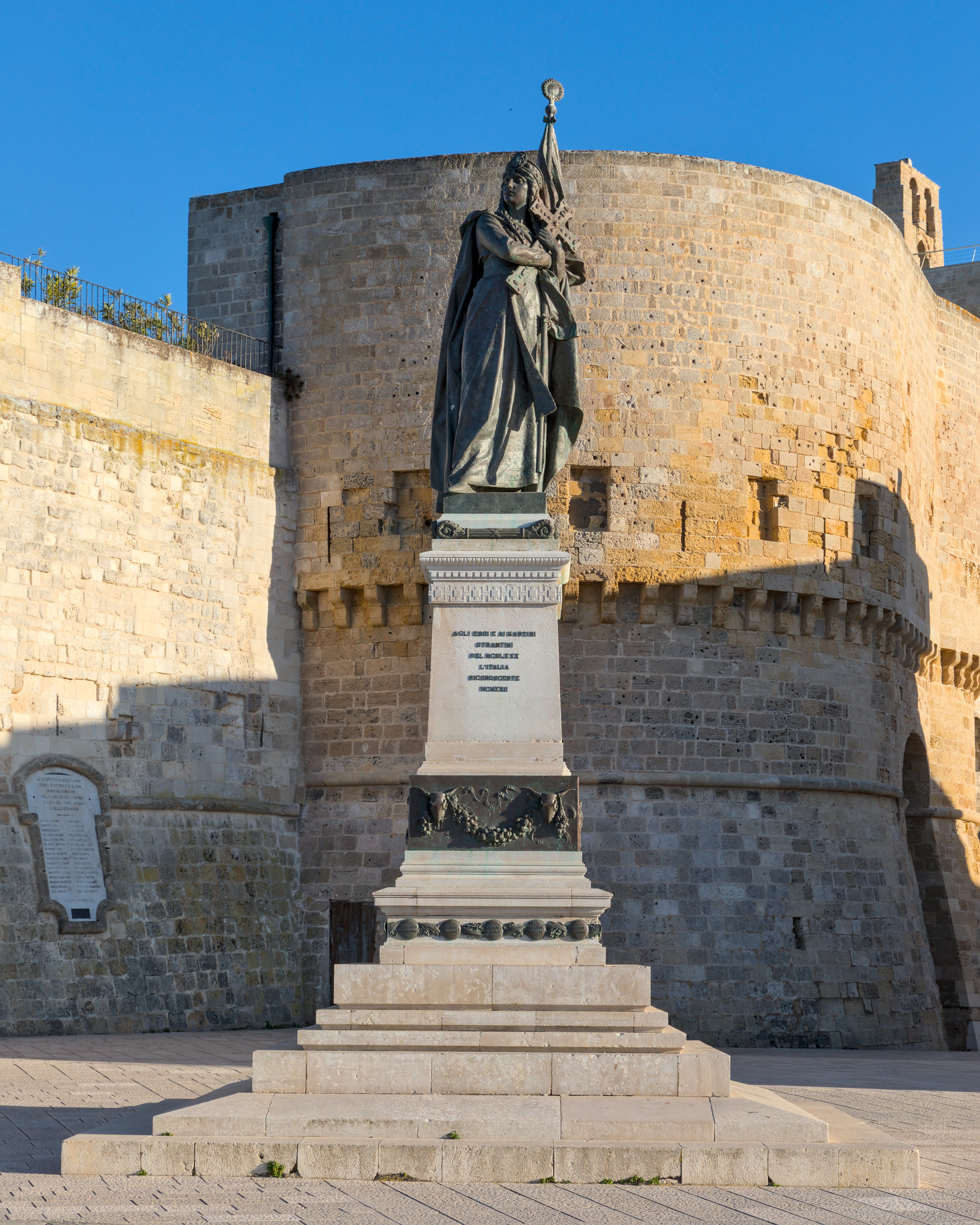
The monument to the martyrs of Otranto present in the homologous castle.

=== The invasion of Otranto ===
One night during the early stages of the siege, the citizens gathered in the cathedral, led by Ladislao De Marco, and decided in a joint session to resist to the very end. When the city's defenses collapsed, some of them attempted to form a defensive line, but it too quickly gave way, and the majority of the civilians gathered in the cathedral.

Archbishop Stefano Agercolo (or Agricoli) de Pendinellis, along with the priests and many male citizens of Otranto, did not surrender upon the Turks' arrival in the city but instead took refuge in the cathedral; just before the Turks burst into the building, De Pendinellis administered the Eucharist to those present. When Gedik stormed the building with his mounted soldiers and demanded that the inhabitants of Otranto renounce their faith in Christ, they flatly refused to do so. The Archbishop, seated on the altar throne, was the first to die; after telling an enemy soldier not to take Christ's name in vain and urging him to convert, he was beheaded by a scimitar blow, and the other priests followed him in death shortly thereafter. Subsequently, Pendinelli's body was hacked to pieces, and the Turks impaled his head on a pike and paraded it through the city streets.

Many other residents of Otranto who refused to renounce their faith were also confined in the cathedral that day and throughout the night, left to reflect once more on the Turkish commander's offer; subsequently, some women from the town were sexually assaulted by enemy soldiers. The monk Giovanni Momplesi—who had defected to the Turkish side during the invasion and was acting as a mediator and interpreter for the invaders—was once again called upon by the enemy commander to convey the demand that they renounce their faith.

=== The martyrdom of the 813 people of Otranto ===
The following day, Gedik ordered a roundup of all the surviving citizens, marching them to Minerva Hill—now known as the Hill of the Martyrs—in groups of fifty. Chained together, they were given one final choice: beheading or apostasy—an act that violated Islamic law (Sharia). All 813 martyrs died (various historians estimate the number at 800).

The first citizen to be killed was the elderly tailor Antonio Pezzulla, known as Il Primaldo, who openly shouted against the invaders that he would die for Jesus Christ. Among the various Otrantians, Macario Nachira, a cultured Basilian monk from an ancient and noble Salentina family from Uggiano la Chiesa. The massacre took place before the eyes of the young men and women who would later be enslaved.

Their bodies remained unburied from the time of their beheading until September 8, 1481, when military forces led by the Duke of Calabria, Alfonso II of Naples—and supported by the papal fleet—reconquered the coastal town.

=== The fate of Puglia and the rest of the city ===
On Gedik's orders, the cathedral was first turned into a stable—an act of contempt—and subsequently converted into a mosque. The Monastery of San Nicola di Casole (located just outside the walls of Otranto, near a hamlet that took its name) was then looted and partially destroyed. Furthermore, a military garrison was stationed there; the soldiers would set out from the area to plunder nearby hamlets.

According to historical accounts, a total of 12,000 people were killed and 5,000 enslaved—including victims from the surrounding territories of the Salento peninsula and the area around Otranto—during the initial stages of the Turkish invasion.

After the desecration of the cathedral, some boys, girls, and elderly women were enslaved, while small children and infants were massacred. The slaves were then deported to the Albanian city of Vlorë, from where they were shipped to Anatolia.

Gedik returned to Albania, leaving behind a garrison of some 4,000 soldiers, who rebuilt the walls of the city, improving the defenses and the moat.

Ottoman raids continued in other neighboring areas of Apulia, until their reconquest by Neapolitan troops the following year.

=== The reconquest of the city and Apulia ===
After the death of Mehmed II on 3 May 1481, events were precipitated by the Ottoman occupation.

After the Neapolitan reconquest, the Otrantines almost immediately got to work restoring and strengthening the city walls. They then renovated the Otranto Cathedral, which had been desecrated. The monasteries of the Dominican Fathers and of the Franciscans were later rebuilt, and, at the end of the 14th century, that of the Capuchin Fathers. Unfortunately, the monastery of San Nicola di Casole was never restored after being sacked and destroyed; its ruins still stand. Other minor religious and civil structures were subsequently renovated.

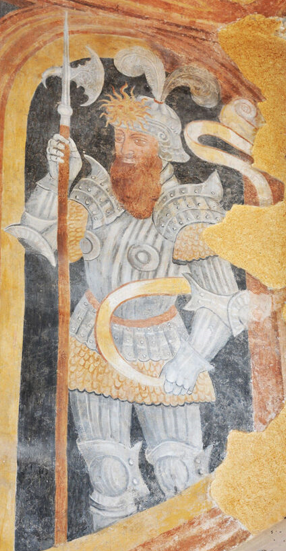
Fresco depicting Zurolo in the convent and church of Santa Maria del Gesù, commonly known as Sant'Antonio.

== Different versions of his death and that of his son ==
There are several versions of hisdeath: in one, he was captured by the Turks and sawn in two; he dies fighting in the defense of the walls probably mutilated, a fact that would have given rise to the first version.

The reprisal was particularly bloody: 800 (813 circa) people were beheaded after 15 days of resistance: commander Zurolo fell almost immediately after a breach was made in the city, on the bastions of the walls during the enemy's last assault. Shortly after, captain Delli Falconi also died.

Even on the fate of the son the sources disagree: according to some he fell heroically together with his father, according to others he was taken prisoner to Turkey, where they made him deny Christ. Francesco Zurolo's son is mistakenly confused with another unknown knight, who died together with the captain himself, since the brave leader had no male children.

=== Burial ===
In the church of Santa Caterina a Formiello in Naples there are two display cases containing some mortal remains-skulls of the heroic defenders of Otranto - are on display, under the altar of the fourth chapel, their number is 240, in them there are also those of the two brave captains recovered and transferred (from Otranto to Naples) by will of Alfonso II d'Aragon.

== Posthumous sponsor ==
He was founder, posthumously – after his death in 1480, who when he was still alive made a will and, among other things, issued a testamentary disposition, naming his daughter Caterina Zurolo (baroness of Oppido Lucano and lady of other lands), to execute after his death the construction work in Oppido Lucano, currently in Tolve, a hamlet of the town, of a religious complex, consisting of a convent (now known as Santa Maria del Gesù, then of Sant'Antonio) with the annexed church of Sant' Antonio to Oppido Lucano; the aforementioned works began in 1482 as denoted by the foundation stone: "MCCCCLXXXII | FRANCISCO ZVRVLO | FECIT".

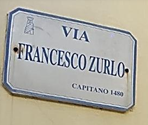
Otranto, Via Francesco Zurlo, road sign entitled: FRANCESCO ZURLO|CAPTAIN 1480.

== Dedications ==
There is a fresco created by the Italian artist Giovanni Todisco, in around 1611, in one of the internal rooms of the convent of Santa Maria del Gesù known as Sant'Antonio, in Oppido Lucano, representing the baron and knight Francesco Zurolo with the halberd held in the right hand and with a scroll in the left, wearing late medieval plate-type armor and helmet.

In the historic center of Otranto, near the Romanesque cathedral, the streets are almost all dedicated to the heroes of the Battle of Otranto. Among these there is also one dedicated to "Francesco Zurlo – captain 1480".

== Quotes ==
- Francesco Tateo (1984), "il Turco mandò ambasciatori al signor Giovanne Antonio Delli Falconi e al segnor Francesco Zurulo con proposta che si volessero rendere, e da loro li fu risposto, che volessero combattere di fuora, che loro si difenderanno da valorosi da dentro in servizio di Dio e del serenissimo loro signore e che morranno tutti.", Chierici e feudatari del Mezzogiorno (Clerics and feudal lords of the South) [the Turk sent ambassadors to Signor Giovanne Antonio Delli Falconi and to Signor Francesco Zurulo with a proposal that they wanted to surrender, and they replied to him that they wanted to fight outside, that they will defend themselves from brave men from within in the service of God and the Most Serene their lord and that they will all die.], Biblioteca di Cultura Moderna (in Italian), p. 899, ISBN 8842023949
- Rosa Lucia Gualdo, Francesco Zurulo si è trovato poi tutto armato, sotto certi muri et repari ruinati, morto; et questa è la verità, licet che de lui variamente se sia dicto. [Francesco Zurulo then found himself all armed, under certain ruined walls and shelters, dead; and this is the truth, since it is said variously about him.], p. 256

== See also ==
- Army of the classical Ottoman Empire
- Barquentine
- Battle of Otranto
- Military of the Ottoman Empire
- Patron saint
- Pope Clement XIV
- Pope Francis
- Vico and Vicoletto of the Zuroli

== Bibliography ==
=== Historical sources ===
- Ibn Kemal. Osman Han'ın Hikâyeleri [Stories of the House of Osman] (Paperback) (in Turkmen).
- Vittorio Zacchino (1978). Brindisi durante l'invasione turca di Otranto [Brindisi durante l'invasione turca di Otranto] (PDF) (Paperback) (in Italian). Brundisi Res. pp. 133–141.
- Francesco Giannone (1905). Memorie storiche: statuti e consuetudini dell'antica terra di Oppido in Basilicata [Historical Memories: Statutes and Customs of the Ancient Land of Oppido in Basilicata] (Paperback) (in Italian). Oppido Lucano (PT): Fratelli Marsala. pp. 40, 41, 42, 43 and 55.
- Giuseppe Gigli (1912). Il tallone d'Italia: II. Gallipoli, Otranto e dintorni, Volume 2 [The Heel of Italy: II. Gallipoli, Otranto, and Surrounding Areas, Volume 2] (Paperback) (in Italian). Vol. 2. Italian Institute of Graphic Arts. p. 118.
- Vittorio Zacchini; Cosimo Damiano Fonseca; et al. (Cosimo Damiano) (19–23 May 1980). La guerra di Otranto del 1480-81. Operazioni strategiche e militari: atti del Convegno internazionale di studio promosso in occasione del V centenario della caduta di Otranto ad opera dei turchi: Otranto, 19-23 maggio 1980 [The War of Otranto of 1480-81. Strategic and Military Operations: Proceedings of the International Conference organized on the occasion of the fifth centenary of the fall of Otranto to the Turks: Otranto, 19–23 May 1980] (Paperback) (in Italian). Otranto (LE): Galatina Congedo 1986. pp. 268–271.
- Don Grazio Gianfreda; et al. (Quintino Gianfreda) (1973). Otranto nella storia [Otranto in history] (Paperback) (in Italian) (12nd ed.). Lecce (LE): EDIZIONI IL GRIFO. pp. 37, 42 and 45. ISBN 9788869940019.
- Lucia Gualdo Rosa; Isabella Nuovo; Domenico Defilippis (1982). Dedalo Edizioni (ed.). Gli umanisti e la guerra otrantina-testi dei secoli XV e XVI [The humanists and the Otranto war - texts from the 15th and 16th centuries] (Paperback) (in Italian). Introduction: Francesco Tateo. Bari: Edizioni Dedalo. pp. 26, 35, 40, 120, 123, 176 and 179. ISBN 9788822060051.
- Francesco Tateo (1984). Laterza (ed.). Chierici e feudatari del Mezzogiorno [Clerics and feudal lords of the South] (Paperback) (in Italian). Laterza. p. 899. ISBN 9788842023944.
- Momčilo Spremić (1987). "Ragusa tra gli aragonesi di Napoli e i Turchi" [Ragusa among the aragonians of Naples and the turks]. Dubrovnik e gli Aragonesi (1442–1495) [Ragusa between the Aragonese of Naples and the Turks] (Paperback) (in Cree). p. 193.
- Giuseppe Greco (1998). Oltre la memoria, Momenti di vita della Parrocchia SS. Pietro e Paolo in Oppido Lucano [Beyond Memory, Moments of Life in the Parish of SS. Pietro e Paolo in Oppido Lucano] (in Italian). Lavello (PZ): FINIGUERRA ARTI GRAFICHE. pp. 252 and later.
- Donato Moro; Gino Pisanò; et al. (Institute of Mediterranean cultures of the province of Lecce) (2002). Gino Pisanò (ed.). Hydruntum, fonti documenti e testi sulla vicenda otrantina del 1480, Volume 1 [Hydruntum, sources documents and texts on the Otranto affair of 1480, Volume 1] (Paperback) (in Italian). Vol. 1. Congedo. pp. 15, 27, 135 and 139. ISBN 9788880864165.
- Donato Moro; Gino Pisanò; et al. (Institute of Mediterranean cultures of the province of Lecce) (2002). Gino Pisanò (ed.). Hydruntum, fonti documenti e testi sulla vicenda otrantina del 1480, Volume 2 [Hydruntum, sources, documents and texts on the Otranto affair of 1480, Volume 2] (Paperback) (in Italian). Vol. 2. Congedo. pp. 18, 32 and 73. ISBN 9788880864394.
- Matteo di Giovanni; Cecilia Alessi; Alessandro Bagnoli (2006). "Siena: La memoria di Pio 11" [Siena: The memory of Pius 11]. In Alessandro Bagnoli, Cecilia Alessi (ed.). Cronaca di una strage dipinta [Chronicle of a painted massacre] (Paperback) (in Italian). ISBN 9788888769134.
- Don Grazio Gianfreda (2007). Q. Gianfreda (ed.). I beati 800 martiri di Otranto [The 800 blessed martyrs of Otranto] (Paperback) (in Italian). Edizioni del Grifo. p. 35. ISBN 9788872613108.
- Francesco Somaini (2008). "La conquista turca di Otranto" [The Turkish Conquest of Otranto]. La Curia romana e la crisi di Otranto [The Roman Curia and the Otranto Crisis] (Paperback) (in Italian). Vol. I. pp. 211 and 212.
- Daniele Bolognini (1 July 2014). Gli 800 martiri d'Otranto. Come i primi cristiani [The 800 Martyrs of Otranto. Like the First Christians] (Paperback) (in Italian). Editrice Elledici. ISBN 9788801056440.
- Luanne D. Zurlo (4 November 2014). Fifteen Feet from the Pope Dispatches from a Sabbatical in Rome (Paperback). Archway Publishing. pp. 57 and 58. ISBN 9781480811287.
- Vito Bianchi (1 March 2018) [2016]. Otranto 1480, Il sultano, la strage, la conquista [Otranto 1480, The Sultan, the Massacre, the Conquest] (E-book) (in Italian) (2nd ed.). Bari: Editori Laterza. ISBN 9788858132340.
- Don Grazio Gianfreda; Quinto Gianfreda (2015). I santi martiri di Otranto [The holy martyrs of Otranto] (Paperback) (in Italian) (12nd ed.). Lecce (LE): EDIZIONI GRIFO. pp. 37, 42 and 45. ISBN 9788869940019.
- Gennaro Zurolo (December 2021). L'Assedio di Otranto del 1480 e i suoi prodi capitani: Francesco Zurolo detto Zurlo e Giovanni Antonio Delli Falconi [The Siege of Otranto in 1480 and its brave captains: Francesco Zurolo known as Zurlo and Giovanni Antonio Delli Falconi] (Paperback) (in Italian). Nola (NA). pp. 25, 52, 53, 54, 55, 56, 57, 58, 59, 60, 61, 62 and 63.
- Vincenzo Scarpello (28 June 2022). Aspetti di storia militare nella guerra d'Otranto [Aspects of military history in the Otranto war] (Paperback) (in Italian). Biblioteca Militare. pp. 33, 40, 41, 45, 46 and 47.
- Albrecht Classen (5 September 2023). "The Ottoman's Army". In Albrecht Classen (ed.). Globalism in the Middle Ages and the Early Modern Age-Innovative Approaches and Perspectives (E-book). Walter de Gruyter GmbH & Co KG. p. 480. ISBN 9783111190228.
- Gennaro Zurolo (2024). "Capitolo IV, Ritratti di personaggi della Casata e Capitolo V, parte I - Monumenti e dimore storiche (roccheforti, castelli, manieri e palazzi) che hanno ospitato personaggi della Casata Albero genealogico illustrato" [Chapter IV, Portraits of members of the House and Chapter V, Part I - Monuments and historic homes (fortresses, castles, manors, and palaces) that have hosted members of the House. Illustrated family tree.]. Casata Zurolo. Origini e sviluppo di una famiglia feudale del Meridione d'Italia [Zurolo House. Origins and development of a feudal family from Southern Italy] (Paperback) (in Italian). pp. 112, 113, 171, 172, 173 and 174.
- Luca Rocco (9 February 2024). Romanzo senza filo, Racconto non lineare della comunicazione radio... e dintorni [Novel without thread, A non-linear tale of radio communication... and beyond.] (E-book) (in Italian). Ledizioni. ISBN 9788855269773.

=== Archival sources ===
- Jakov Lukarević (Luccari) (1605). Ad instantia di Antonio Leonardi (ed.). Copioso ristretto degli annali di Ravsa [Copious summary of the annals of Ravsa] (Ancient book) (in Italian). Vol. 3. Biblioteca Nazionale della Repubblica Ceca. p. 111.
- Lodovico Antonio Muratori (1753). "Anno di Cristo MCCCCLXXXI. Indizione XIV. Di Sisto IV. Papa II. Di Federigo III. Imperadore 30." [Year of Christ MCCCCLXXXI. Indiction XIV. Of Sixtus IV, Pope II. Of Frederick III, Emperor 30.]. In Giambattista Pasquali, bookseller of Venice (ed.). Annali d'Italia dal principio dell'era volgare sino all'anno 1749, compilati da Lodovico Antonio Muratori ... Tomo primo (decimosesto), Dall'anno 1410 dell'era volgare sino all'anno 1500, Volume 13 [Annals of Italy from the beginning of the Common Era to the year 1749, compiled by Lodovico Antonio Muratori ... Volume I (sixteenth), From the year 1410 of the Common Era to the year 1500, Volume 13] (Ancient book) (in Italian). Vol. 13 (2 ed.). Milan (MI). p. 365.
- Count Berardo Candida-Gonzaga (1875). Memorie delle famiglie nobili delle province meridionali d'Italia, volume secondo [Memoirs of the noble families of the southern provinces of Italy, second volume] (Ancient book) (in Italian). Vol. Second volume. Factory typ. of the Cav. G. de Angelis and son. pp. 219, 220 and 223.
- Vincenzo Bindi (1879). "Capitolo 1°, Castrum Novum" [Chapter 1, Castrum Novum]. In Francesco Mormile (ed.). Castel S. Flaviano presso i romani Castrum Novum e di alcuni monumenti di arte negli Abruzzi e segnatamente nel Teramano, studi storici archeologici ed artistici [Castel S. Flaviano near the Roman Castrum Novum and some artistic monuments in Abruzzo and in particular in the Teramo area, historical, archaeological and artistic studies] (Ancient book) (in Italian). Vol. 1. Naples (NA). p. 14.
- Francesco Senatore; Francesco Storti (1997). Dispacci sforzeschi da Napoli: 10 gennaio – 26 dicembre 1461 [Sforza dispatches from Naples: 10 January – 26 December 1461] (Ancient book) (in Italian). Carlone. pp. 114–459.

=== Proceedings of the conferences ===
- Conference staff; Hubert Houben (1 December 2008) [28-31 March 2007]. La conquista turca di Otranto (1480) tra storia e mito, atti del convegno internazionale di studio, Otranto-Muro Leccese, 28-31 marzo 2007 • Volume 1 [The Turkish conquest of Otranto (1480) between history and myth, proceedings of the international conference, Otranto-Muro Leccese, 28–31 March 2007 • Volume 1] (Paperback) (in Spanish and Italian). Vol. 1. Otranto (LE), Muro Leccese (LE): Congedo. p. 369. ISBN 9788880868309.
- Conference staff; Hubert Houben (1 December 2008) [28-31 March 2007]. La conquista turca di Otranto (1480) tra storia e mito, atti del convegno internazionale di studio, Otranto-Muro Leccese, 28-31 marzo 2007 • Volume 2 [The Turkish conquest of Otranto (1480) between history and myth, proceedings of the international conference, Otranto-Muro Leccese, 28–31 March 2007 • Volume 2] (Paperback) (in Spanish and Italian). Vol. 2. Otranto (LE), Muro Leccese (LE): Congedo. pp. 53, 54 and 58. ISBN 9788880868309.

=== Historical novels and poems ===
- Domenico Pelisieri (1867). Stab. tipogr. de' fratelli De Angelis (ed.). Patria e religione o I martiri d'Otranto azione drammatica per Domenico Pelisieri [Homeland and religion or The martyrs of Otranto dramatic action by Domenico Pelisieri] (Paperback) (in Italian). Stab. tipogr. de' fratelli De Angelis. pp. 6, 14 and 18.
- Francesco Grasso (1994). La poesia delle Calabrie [The poetry of Calabria] (Paperback) (in Italian). Vol. 1. Vibo Valentia (VV): QUALECULTURA-Jaca Book. p. 133. ISBN 8816900512.
- Maria Corti (2012) [2005]. "Il capitano Zurlo" [The Captain Zurlo]. L'ora di tutti [Everyone's time] (Paperback) (in Italian). Bompiani. pp. 23, 104 and 161. ISBN 978-88-587-5318-7.
- Daniela Piazza (8 February 2022). Il tempo del giudizio [The time of judgment] (E-book) (Paperback) (in Italian). Rizzoli Libri. p. 31. ISBN 9788817161480.

=== Magazines, Newspaper articles, publications and blogs ===
- Franco Cardini (21 August 1983). "LETTURA DI APPROFONDIMENTO, I martiri di Otranto di Franco Cardini" [FURTHER READING: The Martyrs of Otranto by Franco Cardini]. Il Sabato (Newspaper article) (in Italian).
- Charles Verlinden (1983–1984). "La présence turque à Otrante (1480-1481) et l'esclavage" [The Turkish presence in Otranto (1480-1481) and slavery]. Bulletin de l'Institut historique Belge de Rome (Newspaper article) (in French). 53/54: 165–176.
- Filippo Cirelli; Salvatore Fergola (1840–1841). "Vedere dal testo" [See from the text]. Poliorama Pittoresco (Newspaper article). Year V, Semester I and II (1840/41) (in Italian). Naples (NA): 180.
- Giuseppe Ceci (1900). "La chiesa e il convento di Santa Caterina a Formello" [The church and convent of Santa Caterina in Formello]. Napoli Nobilissima (Newspaper article) (in Italian). IX. Naples (NA): Arte tipografica Napoli - Naples (NA): 49–51, 67–70.
- Giuseppe Ceci (1901). "La chiesa e il convento di Santa Caterina a Formello" [The church and convent of Santa Caterina in Formello]. Napoli Nobilissima (Newspaper article) (in Italian). X. Naples (NA): Arte tipografica Napoli - Naples (NA): 35–39, 101–105, 178–183.
- Colin Heywood (2009). "Mehmed II and the Historians: Babinger's Mehmed der Eroberer during fifty years (1953-2003)". Turcica (Newspaper article). 40: 295–344.
- Roberta (12 October 2012). "La conquista turca di Otranto" [The Turkish conquest of Otranto]. SALENTO.info (Blog) (in Italian) (Otranto e dintorni). Taviano (LC): Marco Bove.
- Father Angelomaria Lozzer (16 June 2013). "I Martiri di Otranto" [The Martyrs of Otranto]. Il Settimanale di Padre Pio «Fate i buoni Cristiani» (Publication) (in Italian) 24. Florence (FI), Frigento (AV): CME Association – *Il Settimanale di Padre Pio*.
- Marco Ottanelli (June 2014). Francesco D’Alpa (ed.). "Buon compleanno Galileo!" [Happy Birthday Galileo!]. L'ATEO (Newspaper article) (in Italian). 97. Rome (RM): UAAR (Unione degli Atei e degli Agnostici Razionali): 11.
- Annamaria G. (6 May 2015). Rosario Nicolardi (ed.). "In memoria del capitano Giovanni Antonio Delli Falconi" [In memory of Captain Giovanni Antonio Delli Falconi]. Racconti Dal Salento (Blog) (in Italian) (4). Rosario Nicolardi.
- Domenico Nardone (10 September 2015). "L'assedio di Otranto (29 luglio-14 agosto 1480) e gli 800 Martiri" [The Siege of Otranto (July 29–August 14, 1480) and the 800 Martyrs]. Bisanzio (Blog) (in Italian).
- Staff of Parentesi Storiche (19 March 2019). "Il riscatto di Otranto: la cacciata dei Turchi e il ritorno degli aragonesi" [The Redemption of Otranto: The Expulsion of the Turks and the Return of the Aragonese]. Parentesi Storiche (Newspaper article) (in Italian). Historical Parentheses Association.
- Alessandro Capone (18 May 2020). "IL MONASTERO DI SAN NICOLA DI CASOLE, dalla distruzione ai giorni nostri" [THE MONASTERY OF SAN NICOLA DI CASOLE, from its destruction to the present day]. Il filo di Aracne (Magazine) (in Italian). Cesario Duma.
- Ilaria (24 April 2025). "Baia dei Turchi: perché si chiama così?" [Baia dei Turchi: why is it called that?]. Salento con gusto, la terra & di Puglia (Blog) (in Italian). Laterradipuglia Srl.
- Cosimo Enrico Marseglia (21 January 2026). Dario De Carlo; Flavio De Marco; Gaetano Gorgoni (eds.). "L'assedio e la presa di Otranto" [The siege and capture of Otranto]. CorriereSalentino.it-un passo avanti (Newspaper article) (in Italian). Lecce (LC).

== Externals links ==
=== Official ===
- Staff of GENEALOGIE DELLE FAMIGLIE NOBILI DEL MEDITERRANEO-(Libro d'Oro della Nobiltà Mediterranea). "ZURLO E CAPECE ZURLO" [GENEALOGIES OF THE NOBLE FAMILIES OF THE MEDITERRANEAN – (Golden Book of the Mediterranean Nobility)]. GENEALOGIE DELLE FAMIGLIE NOBILI DEL MEDITERRANEO-(Libro d'Oro della Nobiltà Mediterranea) (in Italian). Naples (NA). Archived from the original on 7 July 2024. "The genealogy of some of the most illustrious ancestors of the Zurolo family, also called Zurlo or Capece Zurlo."
- Staff of FAI - FONDO PER L'AMBIENTE ITALIANO ETS. "Baia dei Turchi, Otranto, Lecce" [Bay of the Turks, Otranto, Lecce]. FAI - FONDO PER L'AMBIENTE ITALIANO (in Italian). Milan (MI): FAI, FONDO PER L'AMBIENTE ITALIANO ETS.
- Staff of the site (8 June 2006). "Libro d'Oro della Nobiltà Mediterranea-ZURLO E CAPECE ZURLO" [Golden Book of Mediterranean Nobility-ZURLO AND CAPACE ZURLO]. GENEALOGIE DELLE FAMIGLIE NOBILI DEL MEDITERRANEO-(Libro d'Oro della Nobiltà Mediterranea) online (in Italian). "In the history of the city, read the part in which the baron and leader of Francesco Zurolo known as Zurlo is mentioned."
- Staff of Nobili Napoletani (2007). Pasquale Cavallo (ed.). "Capece Zurlo". Nobili Napoletani (in Italian). Naples (NA). "See the paragraph concerning the section concerning the feudal lord and baron Giovanni Zurolo or Zurlo."
- Staff of Nobili Napoletani (2007). Pasquale Cavallo (ed.). "LE PRINCIPALI BATTAGLIE SVOLTESI NEL MEZZOGIORNO D'ITALIA" [THE MAIN BATTLES THAT TAKE PLACE IN SOUTHERN ITALY]. Nobili Napoletani (in Italian). Naples (NA). "See the paragraph relating to the section concerning the battle of Otranto fought by Baron Francesco Zurolo known as Zurlo."
- Staff of DICASTERO DELLE CAUSE DEI SANTI (2019). "Antonio Primaldo e compagni" [Antonio Primaldo and companions]. DICASTERO DELLE CAUSE DEI SANTI (in Italian). Vatican City: Vatican City.
- Staff of Arcidiocesi di Otranto (24 April 2019). "La Cattedrale, Dal 1080 ai giorni nostri, La storia della Cattedrale di Otranto" [The Cathedral, From 1080 to the present day, The history of the Cathedral of Otranto]. Arcidiocesi di Otranto (in Italian). Read the section of the first paragraph. Otranto: Archdiocese of Otranto.
- Staff of the Municipality of Otranto (10 June 2025). "Cattedrale Santa Maria Annunziata, Si erge sul luogo più alto della cittadina, fu concepita affinché potesse essere la chiesa più autorevole di tutta la Puglia" [Cathedral of Santa Maria Annunziata, It stands on the highest point of the town, it was conceived so that it could be the most authoritative church in all of Puglia.]. Città di Otranto (in Italian). Puglia Region.
- Gennaro Zurolo; Pasquale Cavallo (12 November 2024). Pasquale Cavallo (ed.). "Famiglia Zurolo" [Family Zurolo]. Nobili Napoletani (in Italian). See the section by Francesco Zurolo also known as Francesco Zurlo. Naples (NA).

=== Other ===
- Staff of L'Italia turrita. "Monumento ai martiri di Otranto" [Monument to the Martyrs of Otranto]. L'Italia turrita (in Italian).
- Staff of Salvese and Ruggianese Communities, of the Territory and Marines of the Municipality of Salve; Staff of Common of Otranto; Franco Cardini. "Assedio di Otranto nel 1480. L'eccidio di 800 martiri" [Siege of Otranto in 1480. The massacre of 800 martyrs]. SalveWeb.it - Salve Terra Nòscia (in Italian). Salvese and Ruggianese Communities, of the Territory and Marines of the Municipality of Salve.
- Marco Ottanelli (June 2014). UAAR (ed.). "Buon compleanno Galileo!" [Happy birthday Galileo!] (PDF). L'Ateo (in Italian). Rome (RM). p. 11, vol. 97.
- Staff of STORIA MODERNA (14 December 2014). Enrico Galavotti (ed.). "I MARTIRI DI OTRANTO – Un'operazione storiografica strumentale" [THE MARTYRS OF OTRANTO – An instrumental historiographical operation]. STORIA MODERNA-Dall'Umanesimo alla fine dell'Ottocento (in Italian).
- Federico Rapini (8 September 2016). "Difendere i confini dagli invasori: l'esempio dei martiri di Otranto". PN Il Primato Nazionale (in Italian). Rome (RM): PN Il Primato Nazionale.
- Carlo Cesare Montani (May 2018). "Otranto: la strage degli ottocento martiri, Riflessioni attuali a proposito di corsi e ricorsi della storia" [Otranto: The Massacre of the Eight Hundred Martyrs, Current Reflections on the Courses and Recurrences of History]. Storico.org (in Italian). Luciano Atticciati and Simone Valtorta.
- Oreste Paliotti (1 June 2018). "Otranto 1480" [Otranto 1480]. CITTA' NUOVA-CULTURA E INFORMAZIONE (in Italian).
- Staff of historiaregni (14 April 2020). "I turchi ad Otranto" [The Turks in Otranto]. historiaregni (in Italian). Angelo D’Ambra.
- Staff of altaterradilavoro (20 July 2020). "La Battaglia di Otranto. Sogno espansionistico nel sud Italia per gli ottomani, campanello d'allarme per gli stati della Penisola" [The Battle of Otranto. An expansionist dream in southern Italy for the Ottomans, a wake-up call for the states of the Peninsula.]. ALTA TERRA DI LAVORO, GIA' TERRA LABORIS, GIA' LIBURIA, GIA' LIBORIA OLIM CAMPANIA FELIX (in Italian).
