= Giovanni Zurolo =

Italian feudal lord and count (1382–1440)

- Feudal lord, Count
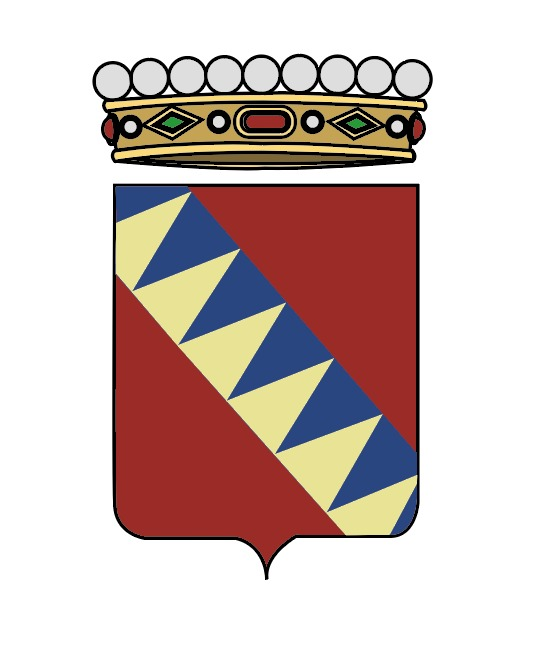
- Coat of arms attributed to the Zurolo family
- Native name: Johannes Zurolo
- Born: 1382
- Died: 1440 (aged 57–58); Naples
- Buried: Cathedral of Naples (presumed)
- Noble family: House of Zurolo
- Spouse: Dalfina Caracciolo
- Issue: Antonella Zurolo
- Father: Bernardo Zurolo
- Mother: Antonella Caracciolo

Giovanni Zurolo, also called Giovanni Zurlo, in Latin Johannes Zurolo (1382 – Naples, 1440), was an Italian feudal lord and count of the Terra d'Angri, Roccapiemonte and fiefdoms of the Kingdom of Naples. He was a member of the noble House of Zurolo or Zurlo family.

A military leader and supporter of the Angevin cause during the dynastic struggles for the throne of Naples, Zurolo defended his lands against the forces of Alfonso V of Aragon. He went into voluntary exile following the fall of Angri in 1421, but was reinstated in his possessions by Queen Joanna II in 1428. In 1436 he founded the convent and church of the SS. Annunziata in Angri. He died in Naples in 1440 and was presumably buried in the Cathedral of Naples.

== Family background ==
A member of the noble House of Zurolo (or Zurlo), Giovanni Zurolo, Count of Zurolo, was the second-born son of Bernardo Zurolo and Antonella Caracciolo, from whom he inherited the Terra d'Angri, Roccapiemonte and other fiefdoms of the Kingdom. He had brothers and sisters, among whom are recorded: Biancamano known as Blanca, Francesco, Salvatore known as Russillo and Emilia.

Giovanni married Dalfina Caracciolo in c. 1416, the daughter of Leonetto and Caterina Filangieri. With Dalfina he had a daughter, Antonella, born c. 1418, the Countess of Bsistenza who in 1439 (Note: (Istrum. Notar Giacomo Ferrillo, year 1449)) married the Count of Buccino, Francesco Caracciolo – known as Petricone.

He received the title of feudal lord directly from King Louis II of Anjou-Valois and feudal dominion over Angri.

== Battle of the Terra d'Angri of 1421 ==
Giovanni relentlessly defended the Terra d'Angri during a battle on 24 September 1421, from Andrea Fortebraccio da Montone's battalion, (also known as Braccio da Montone). During the struggles for succession to the throne of Naples, between Alfonso V of Aragon and Louis III of Anjou, siding with the latter, being the Angevin faction.

=== Background ===
During the dynastic struggles for the succession to the throne of Naples (see the kingdom of Naples), between Alfonso V of Aragon and Louis III of Anjou, Giovanni Zurolo sided in favor of the latter, in fact in this period the fiefdom of Angri drew many benefits thanks to his loyalty to this dynasty, as his paternal grandfather was already a feudal lord loyal to the dynasty (called like his nephew Giovanni Zurolo known as Giovannello).

Once King Alfonso had taken power in the Kingdom of Naples, he then punished the disobedient feudal lord by sending the Italian mercenary leader Braccio da Montone, already appointed by him and the queen, to the Terra d'Angri Joanna II of Anjou, on 21 September 1421, Count of Foggia and Prince of Capua and "perpetual general" (i.e. permanent governor of the entire Neapolitan kingdom).

On 23 September Andrea and King Alfonso visited various Neapolitan locations, after which he was instructed by the rulers to attack the fiefdom of Angri governed by Count Giovanni Zurolo, who had not accepted the loyalty of the new sovereign. Braccioforte marched towards the Sarno valley (see Agro Nocerino-Sarnese) with his mercenary army made up of around 12,000 men and, mostly, crossbowmen, foot infantry and knights.

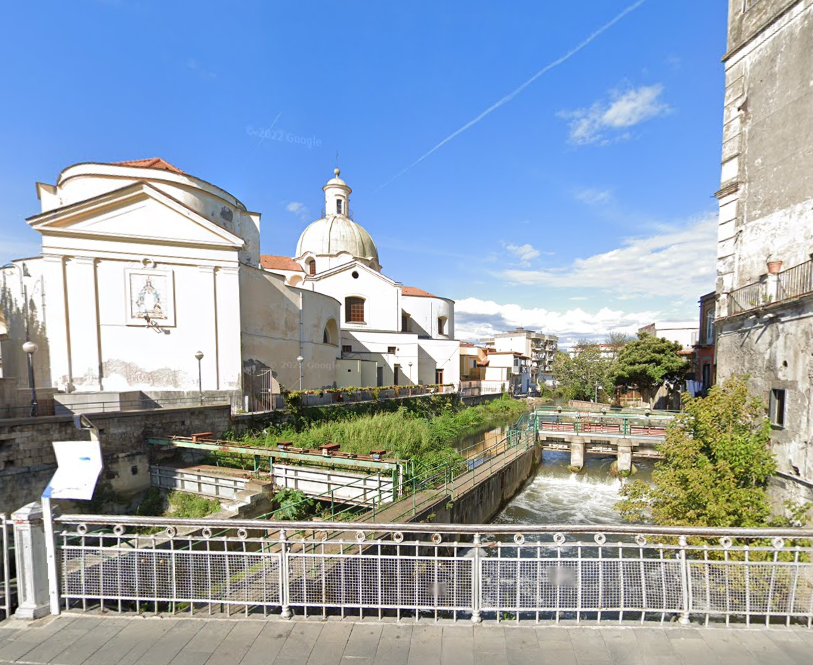
Part of the Pons Sarni which overlooks the river of the same name which passes through the city of Scafati and the church of Santa Maria delle Vergini, 15th century.

=== Battle account ===
At dawn on 24 September 1421 the mercenaries headed towards the border of Angri, more precisely towards a bridge in the current city of Scafati (at the time the dominion of the Terra d'Angri, in fact the city of Scafati did not yet exist), the bridge was called Pons Sarni (which exists and still overlooks the Sarno river in that locality), They waited there for the enemy because the area was easier for those attacked to defend themselves, furthermore, there was also a military fortification, which currently no longer exists.

The feudal lord's plan envisaged a defensive fight in this area with the help of the armed forces of his brother Francesco Zurolo, count of Nocera dei Pagani and Montoro, and then also being assisted by the military aid of count Muzio Attendolo Sforza of Cotignola who it should have arrived a few days later, since it was a fairly easy area to defend and the banks of the river already allowed excellent defense by those attacked. Giovanni Zurolo waited with the local militia near the Angrese border but help from Francesco and Sforza never arrived. Betrayed by his brother (in truth his brother tried in vain to convince him to give up but the count wouldn't hear of it), Giovanni had to fight alone against an overwhelming enemy army, retreating immediately after Braccio's first attack to the fief of Angri and instead headed towards the city, after a few hours and a few enemy assaults it was invaded and sacked.

The news of the military defeat of Angri spread quickly among the various inhabitants of the lands of the Agro and the nearby city of Nocerina, the looting and destruction was a warning to the locals to guarantee obedience towards the new Aragonese dynasty. Braccio, after taking Angri, left a group of his soldiers under the command of a captain governor, a certain Luca de Triccia, since, in the evening, he headed to conquer Castellammare di Stabia with the rest of the army.

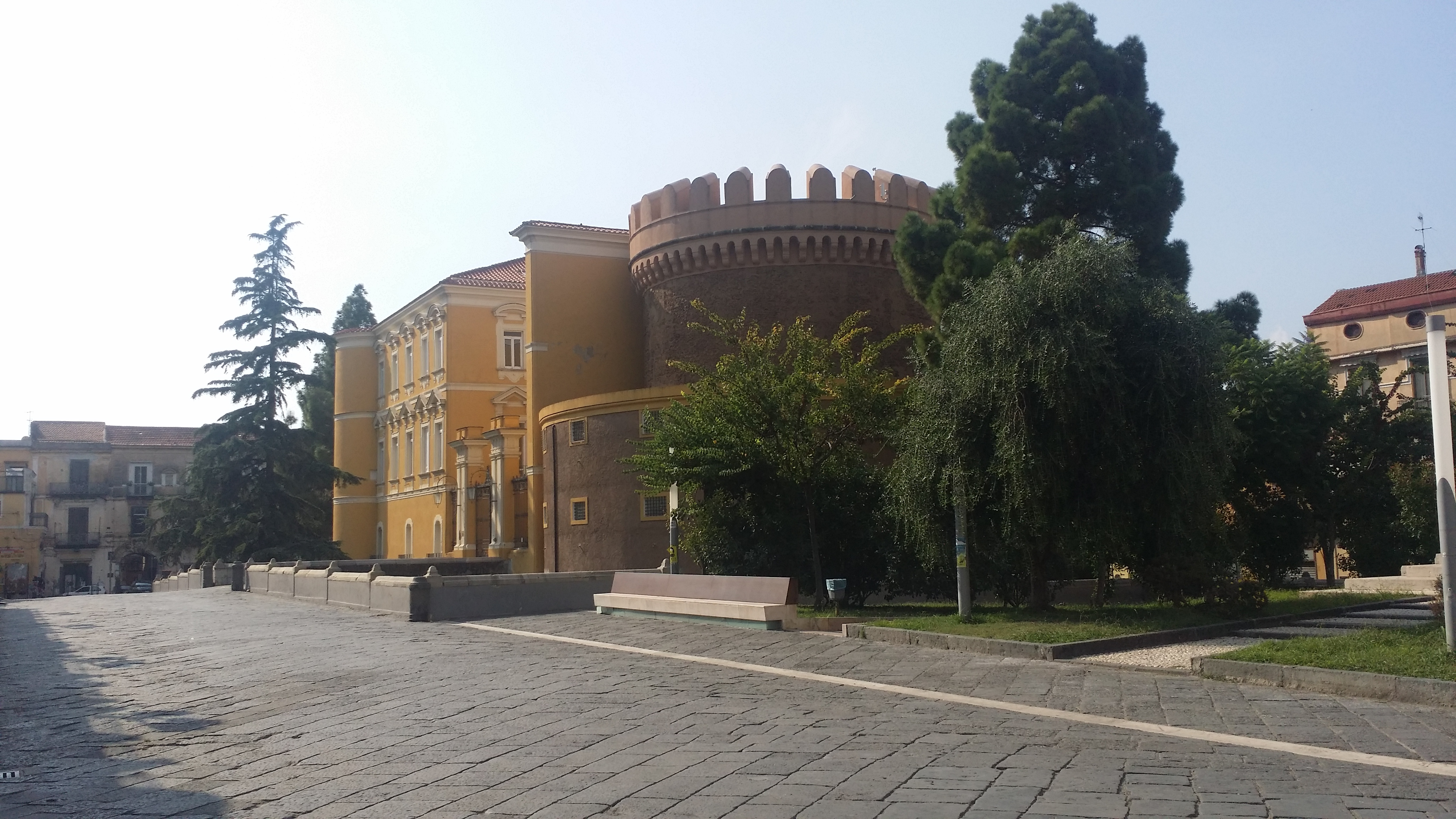
Castle and Palazzo Doria of Angri, located in the square of the same name.

=== Other accounts of the battle ===
According to ancient and official sources, Count Giovanni Zurolo, after having briefly discussed against the enemy army at the Pons Sarni, headed with his soldiers to the Oppido Angarium (fortress city of Angri) and fought with the local citizens, a militia and various improvised leaders until the end of the clash, in fact after a few hours of various enemy assaults they surrendered but the city was not spared by the attackers.

Other sources instead speak of a retreat by Zurolo from his brother to the fortress of Nocera dei Pagani and of abandoning his lands at the mercy of his enemies, from which the Angrese had to defend themselves alone and against an overwhelming army.

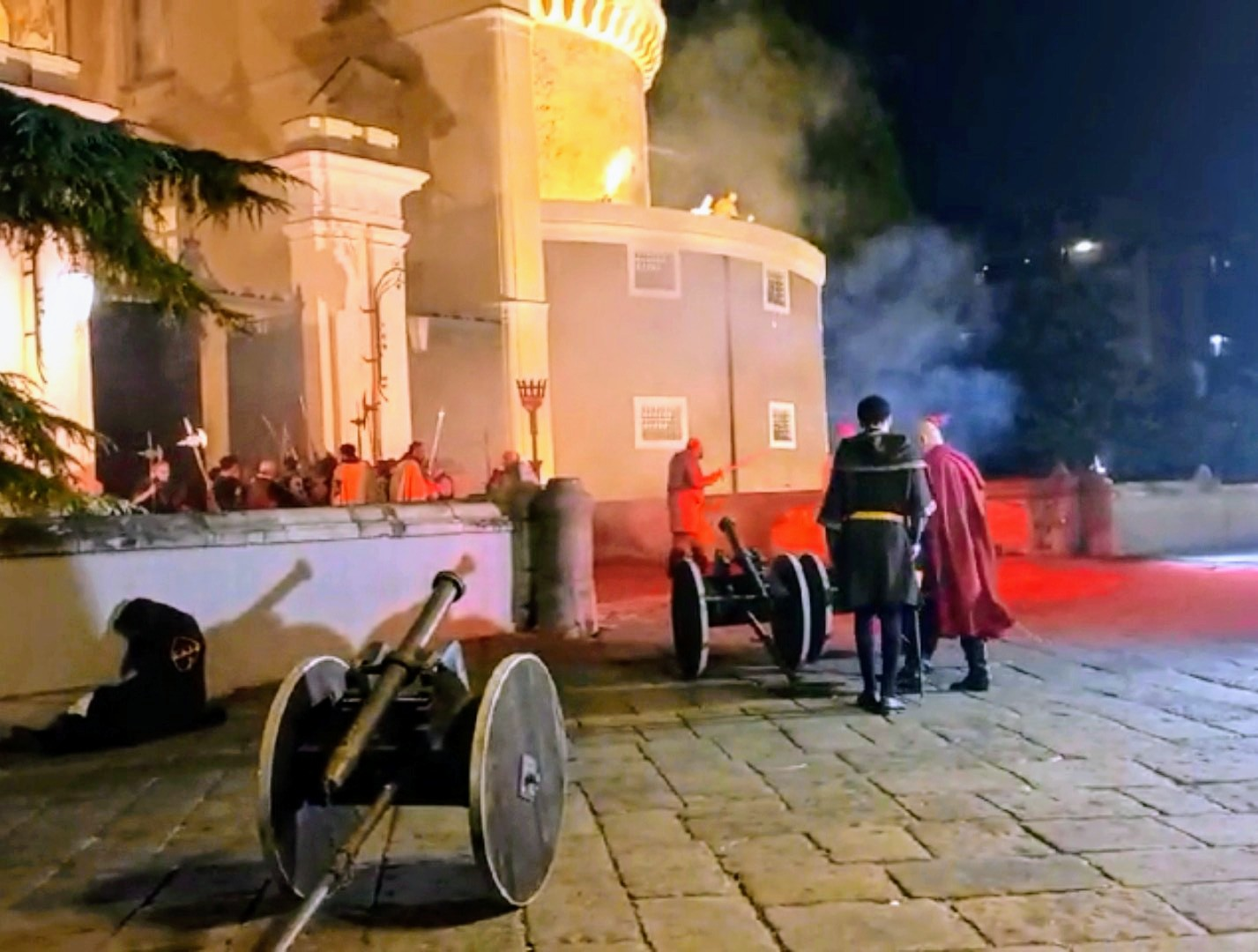
Assault on the castle of 24 September 1421, event of the Palio Storico Città di Angri (year 2023), historical-reenactment event linked to the events of 1421-25 and 1428-36, in Piazza Doria.

== Reinstatement of the Angri Fiefdom ==
In 1428 the fief of Angri was restored (to which the historical-reenactment events 1421–1425 and 1428–1436 called "Palio Storico Città di Angri" are linked). During the period in which Giovanni Zurolo strategically distanced himself from Angri, his brother Francesco simultaneously leveraged the special privileges that had been bestowed upon him with his surrender. He worked hard in King Alfonso's court to ensure that the fiefdom of Angri could return to the legitimate ownership of his brother and his respective heirs. Angri, in fact, with the Cancellara fiefdom (see the Grancia di Pizzaguto) once again entered the feudal succession of the Zurolo with all the connected jurisdictional rights (by virtue of the royal disposition of Ferdinand I of Aragon, known as Ferrante XVIII, King of Naples, 1458–1494), with a certain Scipione (son of Salvatore Rossillo and nephew of Giovanni) who in 1485 is listed, in the documents of the time, as dominus utilis of Angri; then on 5 February 1463, he was invested with the fiefdom of Solofra, again by the same sovereign, Ferrante I. Ad antiquo therefore the fiefdom of Angri remained with the Zurolo counts until it came under the dominion of other noble and powerful lords of the kingdom.

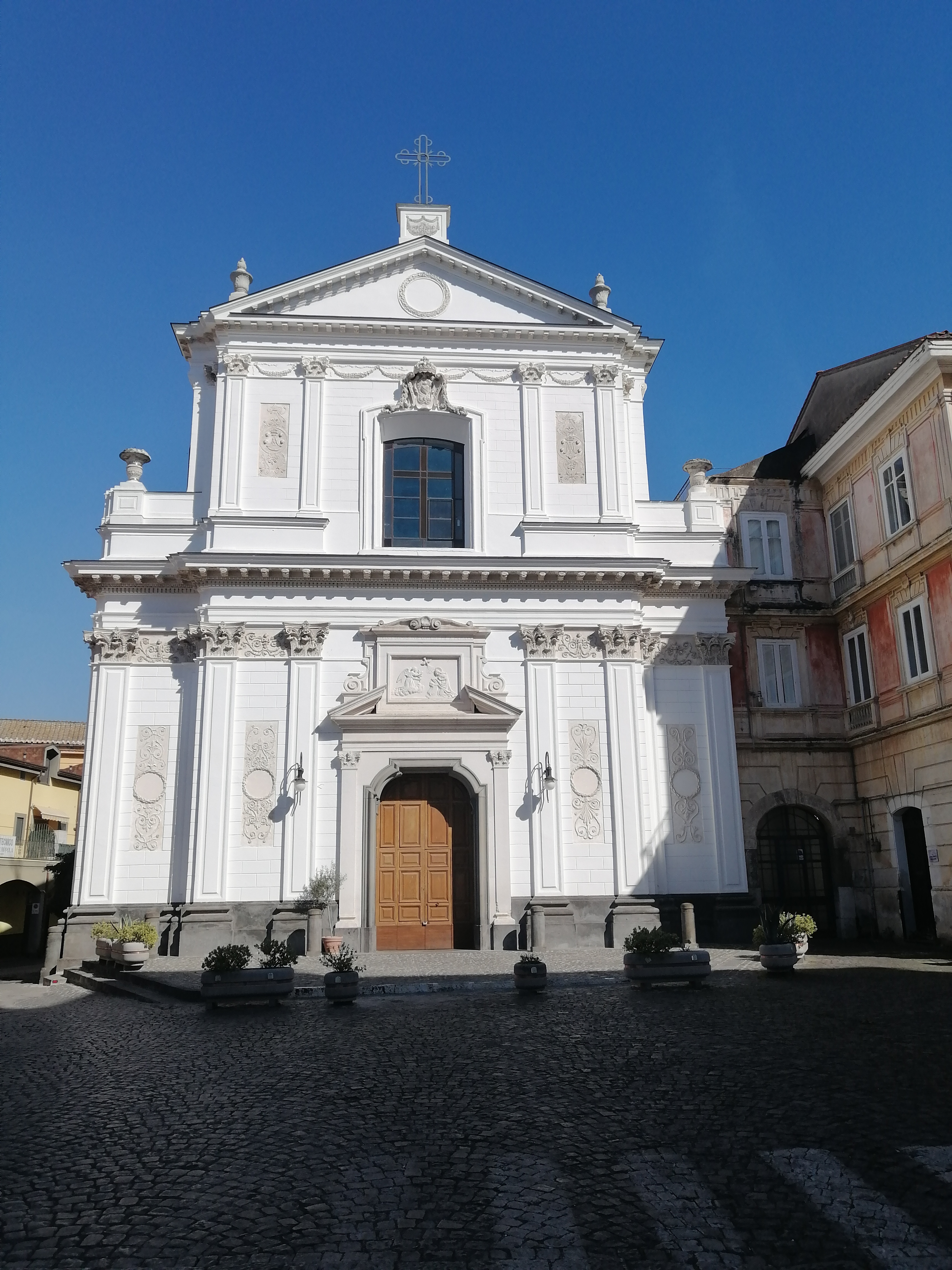
Facade, in Vanvitellian architectural style, of the church SS. Annunziata in Angri, with adjacent former convent, formerly a charitable hospice, of the Dominican preaching friars, located in the square of the same name, 13th–15th centuries.

== Sponsor ==
He was the founder of the former convent of the Dominican preaching fathers, with the adjoining church of the SS. Annunziata della Terra d'Angri (actually in place Annunziata), on a previous chapel also dedicated to the SS. Annunziata. The notarial deed drawn up before the major church (later Collegiate) of Angri was executed on 26 July 1436.

== Battles of Terra d'Angri of 1438 ==
At the beginning of June 1438, when King Alfonso, with his army of four thousand men on horseback, moved to occupy the fortress of Angri, Count Zurolo with a handful of soldiers fought heroically and forced him to stop at the Ponte di Scafati (Scafati brige), blocking his path. In these bloody battles, which lasted for days, between the partisans of the Angevin and Aragonese factions, the young captain Angelo Concilio, of the Casato de' Concilij of Angri, heroically lost his life.

== Death and burial ==
Giovanni, feudal lord of Angri, died in around 1440, and was probably buried in the church of his greatest ancestors of Santa Restituta in the Cathedral of Naples.

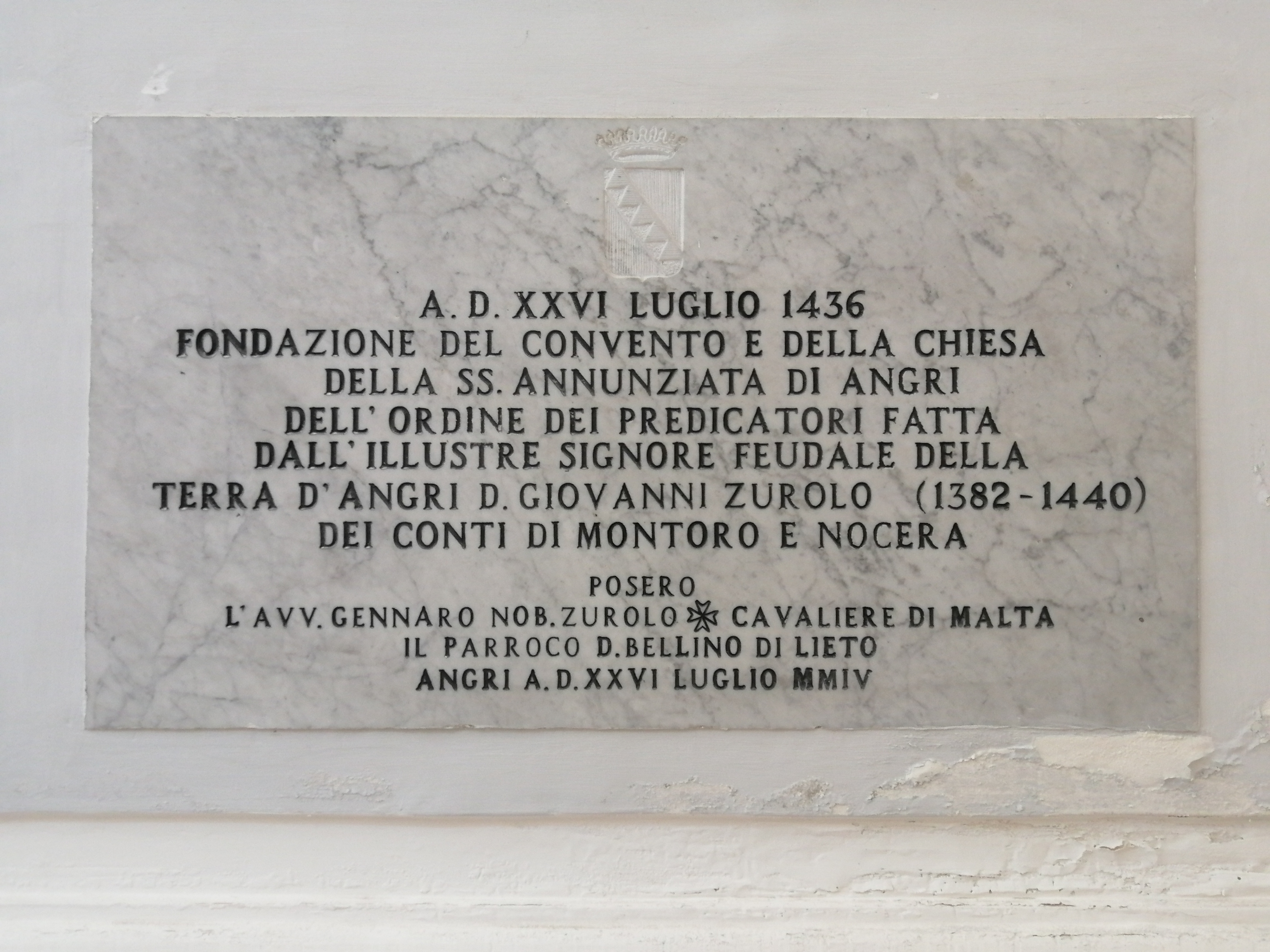
Commemorative plaque of the foundation of the church and convent of the Ss. Annunziata, currently the municipality of Angri, in the Terra d'Angri, in July 1436.

== Dedications ==
- Road plaques in white marble entitled Giovanni Zurolo affixed at the end of the road, where it begins and ends, on the walls of two buildings for civic use, a third plaque was instead entitled Largo Palio Storico, of the same workmanship as the previous ones, affixed in the clearing between Via Coronati and Via Amendola, relating to the events of 1421–1425 and 1428–1436 called "Palio Storico Città di Angri". The aforementioned headstones were subsequently removed by the same municipality for legal reasons.
- Via Zurlo, in Angri, dedicated to the feudal lord of the Terra d'Angri, Count Giovanni Zurolo (mistakenly called Zurlo), around the 70s of the last century.
- In Montoro, now Montoro Inferiore, there was a chapel dedicated to Santa Margherita, located in the ancient farmhouse of Borgo, Mercatello district. There, in the altarpiece, Bernardo Zurolo and his sons, Francesco Zurolo and Giovanni Zurolo were represented.
- In the church of the Ss. Annunziata of Angri, a plaque was placed inside by the community of faithful, the parish priest, and a member of the Zurolo family, in memory of the foundation of the same, by Count Giovanni Zurolo, dated in July 2004.

== See also ==
- Alfonso V of Aragon
- Angri
- Braccio da Montone
- House of Zurolo
- Joanna II of Naples
- Louis III of Anjou
- Naples
- Scafati
- Zurolo

== Bibliography ==
=== Historical sources ===
- Bartolomeo Facio; et al. (Filoponi, Filoterpse & Filoponi, Clidano, Gesuiti : Collegio Romano) (1563). Bartholomei Faccij De rebus gestis Alphonsi Aragonij regis libri 7. Ad Caesarem Gonzagam . [Bartholomew Faccius on the deeds of King Alfonso of Aragon book 7. To Caesar Gonzaga ..] (in Latin). Vol. VI. p. 78.
- Erasmo Ricca (1869). Istoria de' feudi del regno delle Due Sicilie di qua dal faro intorno alle successioni legali ne' medesimi dal XV al XIX secolo [History of the fiefdoms of the kingdom of the Two Sicilies on this side of the lighthouse around the legal successions of the same ones from the 15th to the 19th century] (in Italian). Vol. IV. Naples (NA).
- De Santi. (Registri della Cancelleria Angioina, anno 1424, fol. 107) [(Registers of the Angevin Chancellery, year 1424, fol. 107)] (in Italian). Vol. 2.
- Gennaro Orlando (1884). Storia di Nocera De' Pagani [History of Nocera De' Pagani] (in Italian). Vol. II. Forni. pp. 194–195. ISBN 9788827107331.
- Pietro Vincenti (1710). La contea di Nola dal sec. XIII al sec. XVI sec [The county of Nola since the century. XIII to the century. 16th century] (in Italian).
- Angelo Di Costanzo (1710). Dom. Ant. Parrino (ed.). Historia del regno di Napoli [History of the kingdom of Naples] (in Italian). Vol. XVII. pp. 279, 406.
- Don Vincenzo Pastore (1980). "Angri distrutta da Braccio Forte da Montone" [Angri destroyed by Braccio Forte da Montone]. In Arti grafiche Palumbo & Esposito (ed.). Dalla Preistoria ai Nostri giorni-volume primo, dalle remote origini al dominio feudale dei Doria [From Prehistory to Our Days – first volume, from remote origins to the feudal dominion of the Doria] (in Italian). Vol. primo [first]. Cava de' Tirreni, Italy: Tipografia. pp. 463–474.
- Don Pasquale Pannone (1991). ARTI GRAFICHE F.LLI MERCURIO s.n.c. (ed.). Breve Cenno Storico su Angri-Profilo di Mons. Alfonso Raiola-Note di Gianfranco Forino [Brief Historical Note on Angri-Profile of Monsignor Alfonso Raiola-Notes by Gianfranco Forino] (in Italian). Angri (SA). p. 7.
- Gennaro Zurolo (2004). Regesto del documento d'Archivio del XV secolo. Atto di fondazione del Convento e Chiesa della SS. Annunziata di Angri [Summary of the 15th century archive document. Deed of foundation of the Convent and Church of the SS. Annunziata of Angri] (in Italian). Angri (SA).
- Salvatore Silvestri (2006). Editrice Gaia (ed.). Dal fundo Marciano a San Marzano sul Sarno, un viaggio lungo 1500 anni [From Fundo Marciano to San Marzano sul Sarno, a 1500 year long journey] (in Italian). Editrice Gaia. p. 188. ISBN 9788889821206.
- Gennaro Zurolo (2008). EDIZIONI COMUNE ANGRI (ed.). Le Strade di Angri [The Streets of Angri] (in Italian). Boscoreale (NA). pp. 307–309.
- Gennaro Zurolo (2010). Il riscatto di Zurolo (26 giugno 1428), Regesto del documento d'Archivio del XV secolo, Diploma Reale di Giovanna II d'Angiò [The ransom of Zurolo (26 June 1428), Summary of the 15th century archive document, Royal Diploma of Joan II of Anjou] (in Italian). Angri (SA).
- Gennaro Zurolo (December 2019). "Il conte Giovanni Zurolo" [Count Giovanni Zurolo]. Sulle origini di una chiesa angioina nella Terra d'Angri: la SS. Annunziata [On the origins of an Angevin church in the Terra d'Angri: the SS. Annunziata] (in Italian). Angri (SA). pp. 33–38, 55–56. ISBN 9-788899-742430.
- Gennaro Zurolo (2024). "IV". Casata Zurolo. Origini e sviluppo di una famiglia feudale del Meridione d'Italia [Zurolo House. Origins and development of a feudal family from Southern Italy] (in Italian). p. 112.

=== Archival sources ===
- SANT'ANNA NOCERA ARCHIVE (1428). Platea <Reassunto delle Bolle Pontificie, Diplomi Reali e Istromenti Antichi>, anno 1428, p./f. 17v.: La Regina Giovanna II con questo Diploma diretto a Giovanni Zurolo utile Sig.re della Terra d'Angri [Platea <summary of='' the='' Papal='' Bulls,='' Royal='' Diplomas='' and='' Ancient='' Instruments=''>, year 1428, p./f. 17v.: Queen Giovanna II with this Diploma addressed to Giovanni Zurolo helpful Lord of the Terra d'Angri] (in Italian). p. (p./f. 17v.).
- DOMINICAN GENERAL CURIA ARCHIVE OF SANTA SABINA ROME (1436). Fondatione del Conv.to della SS.ma Ann.ta d'Angri dell'Ord.ne de' Pred.ri fatta senza nessun peso dal q.m Ill.mo Sig.re di T.ra di Angri D. Giovanni Zurolo addì 26 di Luglio 1436 [Foundation of the Conv.to of the SS.ma Ann.ta d'Angri of the Ord.ne de' Pred.ri made without any weight by the q.m Ill.mo Signor of Tra di Angri D. Giovanni Zurolo on the 26th of July 1436]. XIV (in Italian). Vol. A, part two. pp. ff.306r.–313r.
- Bishop Giovanni Antonio Campano (1545). Nicolaus Bryling (ed.). De Vita et Gestis Andreae Brachij Perusini, Italicæ olim Militie Imperatoris strenuissimi [On the Life and Acts of Andrea Brachii Perusini, once the most energetic Emperor of the Italian Militia] (in Latin). Basilea (CH). p. 325.
- Bishop Giovanni Antonio Campano; et al. (Giovanni Battista Poggio) (1572). L'Historie et vite di Braccio Fortebracci detto da Montone, et di Nicolo Piccinini Pervgini [The Historie et vite of Braccio Fortebracci known as da Montone, and of Nicolo Piccinini Pervgini.] (in Latin). p. 115.
- NATIONAL ARCHIVES OF MALTA (1613). Joannis Zurolo de Neap. Russillo [Salvatore] Zurulo ... Bernardo Zurolo [Joannis Zurolo de Neap. Russillo [Salvatore] Zurulo ... Bernardo Zurolo] (AOM 4190). doc. I-XLVII (in Italian). pp. ff.31r.–85r.
- Angelo Di Costanzo (1710). Dom. Ant. Parrino (ed.). Historia del regno di Napoli divisa in 20 libri. Aggiuntavi in questa prima Napoletana impr. la vita dell'autore epilogata in un elogio di Lorenzo Cresso [History of the kingdom of Naples divided into 20 books. Added to this first Neapolitan company. the author's life epilogued in a eulogy by Lorenzo Cresso] (in Italian). Vol. XVII. pp. 279, 406.
- Count Berardo Candida Gonzaga (1875). Memorie delle famiglie nobili delle province meridionali d'Italia, volume secondo [Memoirs of the noble families of the southern provinces of Italy, second volume] (in Italian). Vol. second. ...it happened that this family was surnamed Piscicelli-Zurlo and then only Zurlo. Factory typ. of the Cav. G. de Angelis and son. p. 219.
- Alberto Maria Ghisalberti (1960). "100". Dizionario biografico degli Italiani [Biographical dictionary of Italians] (in Italian). Istituto della Enciclopedia italiana. ISBN 978-88-12-00032-6.
- COMMON OF ANGRI; TECHNICAL COMMISSION; Gennaro Zurolo (historian); Antonino Pastore (historian); Giovanni Rossi (art expert); Anna Parlato (secretary) (17 December 2015). Regolamento-Disciplinare per le parate medievali e le rievocazioni storiche, degli eventi del 1421–25 e del 1428–36, denominate Palio Storico Città di Angri, Angri 2016 [Disciplinary Regulations for medieval parades and historical re-enactments of the events of 1421–25 and 1428–36, called Palio Storico Città di Angri, Angri 2016] (in Italian). (G.C. Resolution no. 237 of 12 November 2015), (Municipality of Angri, City Council Resolution no. 30 of 23 March 2016, concerning the approval of this Regulation for medieval parades and historical re-enactments, events of 1421–25 and 1428–36, called Palio Storico Città di Angri, previously institutionalised, by virtue of a statutory amendment, with Council Resolution C. n. 69 of 17 December 2015).
