= Sanctuary of San Girio, Potenza Picena =

Church in Potenza Picena Italy

Coordinates: 43°22′55.8″N 13°38′47.8″E

The Sanctuary of San Girio is a Roman Catholic church located in the town limits of Potenza Picena, province of Macerata, in the region of Marche, Italy.

== History ==
The church, originally built over the tomb of the saint in 1298, was rebuilt in 1560. In 1936, was transformed into three aisles and enriched with new facade and new bell tower. In 1951, the apse was rebuilt, uncovering the more ancient crypt. The frescoes in the interior were painted by Ciro Pavisa and depict the life of the saint. Inside the sanctuary, Benedetto Biancolini painted a canvas depicting San Girio, where you can see an ancient view of the village of Monte Santo (former name of Potenza Picena).

According to tradition, the saint, born in 1274 in Lunel in now Southern-France, and he decided to abandon all wealth to journey in pilgrimage with his brother to Palestine. After reaching Rome, he wanted to join the bishop of Ancona, but during the journey, in the territory of Monte Santo, caught by large and sudden pain, he died, despite the care of his brother. Upon his death, the bells of Pieve Santo Stefano miraculously began to play. When the inhabitants of Recanati and Monte Santo fought for the remains of the saint, a child in swaddling spoke and said that they were to leave two oxen without driving determine where to bury the body: the oxen stopped at the present site of the Sanctuary.
