= Ciro Pavisa =

Italian painter

Ciro Pavisa (7 March 1890 – 1972) was an Italian painter, known for painting still lifes, landscapes, and sacred subjects in the Marche region.

== Biography ==
Ciro was born in Mombaroccio in the Marche. By the age of 13 years, city council sponsored his training at the Scuola di Arte of Urbino. By the age of thirteen he had already astonished the villagers with his drawings so that the City Council established, by resolution, to offer a subsidy to the family. So the boy could attend the Scuola d'Arte of Urbino, where he studied under Luigi Scorrano, a disciple of Domenico Morelli. He then moved to Rome, where he was influenced by Giovanni Segantini and Gaetano Previati. He obtained a license to teach art, and obtained positions in Tuscany, Padua, and finally in 1931 he was appointed professor at the Istituto Statale d'Arte Ferruccio Mengaroni in Pesaro. He is known for painting for various churches in the Marche. He died in Pesaro.
