= Zumbo (surname) =

Zumbo is an Italian surname. Notable people with the surname include:

- Adriano Zumbo (born 1981), Australian chef
- Bruno Zumbo, Canadian Professor, Mathematician, Measurement, Psychometrics
- Gaetano Giulio Zumbo (1656–1701), Italian sculptor
- Jim Zumbo, American hunter
