= Oppido Lucano =

- Comune
- Comune di Oppido Lucano
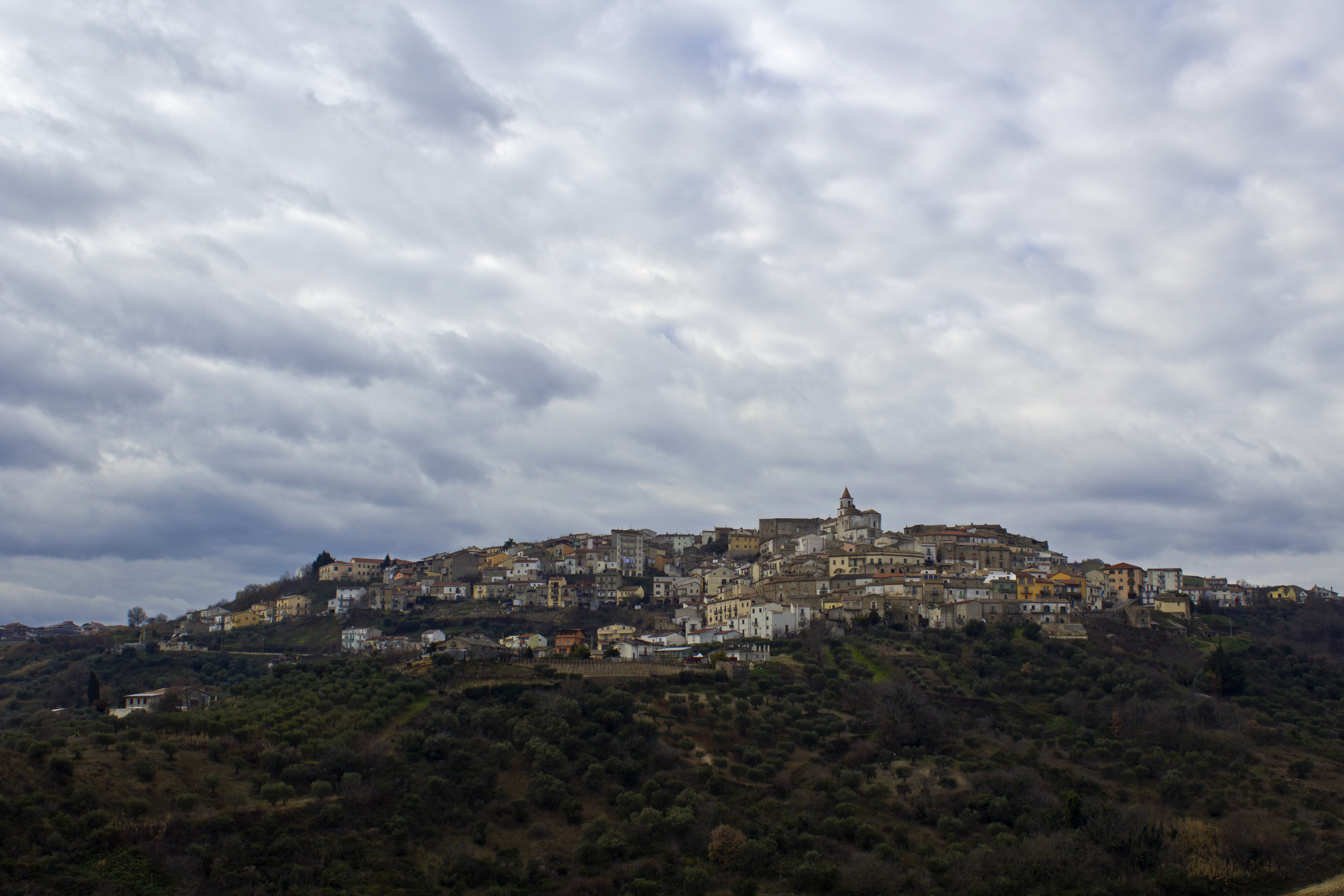
- View of Oppido Lucano

- Location within Italy Location within Basilicata
- Coordinates: 40°46′N 15°59′E
- Country: Italy
- Region: Basilicata
- Province: Potenza (PZ)

Government
  - Mayor: Antonia Maria Fidanza

Area
  - Total: 54.88 km^{2} (21.19 sq mi)
- Elevation: 674 m (2,211 ft)

Population (2018-01-01)
  - Total: 3,897
  - Density: 71.01/km^{2} (183.9/sq mi)
- Demonym: Oppidani
- Time zone: UTC+1 (CET)
  - Summer (DST): UTC+2 (CEST)
- Postal code: 85015
- Dialing code: 0971
- ISTAT code: 076056
- Patron saint: St. Anthony of Padua
- Saint day: June 13
- Website: Official website

Oppido Lucano (Oppidano: Òppete; Latin: Oppidum; Oscan: Opinum) is a town and comune in the province of Potenza, in the Southern Italian region of Basilicata. It is bounded by the comuni of Acerenza, Cancellara, Genzano di Lucania, Irsina and Tolve.

== Main sights ==
Oppido Lucano contains several historic religious and architectural sites, including the Church and Convent of St. Anthony, the rock church of St. Antuono, the remains of a Norman castle believed to have been built between 1047 and 1051, and the Convent of Santa Maria del Gesù.

== People ==
- Francesca Lancellotti
- Obadiah the Proselyte
