= Bruno Zumbo =

Bruno D. Zumbo
- Occupation: Mathematician
- Years active: 1990–present

Academic background
- Education: Carleton University; University of Alberta
- Doctoral advisor: Donald W. Zimmerman

Academic work
- Discipline: Mathematical Science, Psychometrics, Statistics
- Sub-discipline: Psychometrics, Measurement
- Institutions: University of British Columbia

Bruno D. Zumbo is a Canadian mathematical scientist trained in the tradition of research that combines mathematical analysis, statistics, and probability to develop theory and solve problems arising in measurement, testing, and surveys in the social, behavioral, and health sciences. He is currently Professor and Distinguished University Scholar, the Canada Research Chair in Psychometrics and Measurement (Tier 1), and formerly the Paragon UBC Professor of Psychometrics & Measurement at University of British Columbia.

His research in the mathematical sciences reflects a wide range of topics in mathematical analysis and statistics aimed at developing and exploring the properties and applications of mathematical structures of measurement, survey design, testing, and assessment.

== Education ==
He completed his B.Sc. at the University of Alberta (Edmonton, AB) and his MA and Ph.D. from Carleton University (Ottawa, ON). His doctoral dissertation titled "Statistical Methods to Overcome Nonindependence of Coupled Data in Significance Testing" was under the direction of Donald W. Zimmerman (Carleton University, Ottawa).

== Career ==
Zumbo teaches in the graduate Measurement, Evaluation, & Research Methodology Program with an additional appointment in the Institute of Applied Mathematics, and earlier also in the Department of Statistics, at the University of British Columbia (UBC) in Vancouver, British Columbia, Canada. Prior to arriving at UBC in 2000, he held professorships in the Departments of Psychology and of Mathematics at the University of Northern British Columbia (1994-2000), and earlier in the Faculty of Education with an adjunct appointment in the Department of Mathematics at the University of Ottawa (1990-1994).

His research interests have been focused on the mathematical sciences of measurement and scientific methodology with a blend of mathematics, social sciences like psychology, philosophy of science and measurement in science.

He is known for his contributions in the fields of statistics, psychometrics, validity theory, and studies of the mathematical basis of classical test theory, item response theory, and measurement error models. His program of research is actively engaged in psychometrics for language testing, quality of life and wellbeing, and health and human development.

== Awards and recognition ==
- Distinguished University Scholar, 2017
- Pioneer in the Psychometrics of Quality of Life, 2018 by the International Society for Quality of Life Studies
- Centenary Medal of Distinction, awarded in 2019 by the UBC School of Nursing
- Paragon UBC Professorship in Psychometrics and Measurement
- Tier 1 - Canada Research Chair in Psychometrics and Measurement, held at the University of British Columbia, awarded in 2020
