= Luigi Scorrano =

Italian painter (1849–1924)

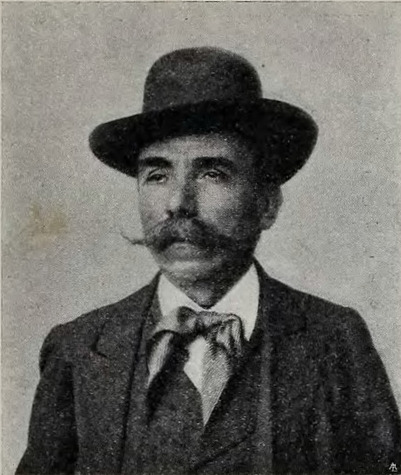
- Born: 28 June 1849
- Died: 15 June 1924 (aged 74)
- Occupation: Painter

Luigi Scorrano (June 1849 – June 15, 1924) was an Italian painter who won many awards and was given a pension by the Italian government.

== Career ==
Born at Lecce in Apulia, Scorrano studied at the Academy of Naples and became a prolific artist, often exhibiting his work at the National Expositions and Promotrici. For example, at the Promotrice of Naples, he exhibited: How Many Sad Memories! and Teliclio. He exhibited at Livorno Una canzone d' amore; at Genoa Una canzone; in Naples La toelette di nozze; in Rome Baptism of Montecassino; Rebecca; L'Ambasciata dì matrimonio (once found in the Ministry of Justice of Rome); I regali alla sposa; and Un Racconto, once found in the Hall of the Provincial Council of Naples with a reproduction of the Baptism of Montecassino; Gioie intime, exhibited at Milan; Conforto e lavoro, exhibited at Venice.

In the Council Hall of the town of Terlizzi in the Province of Bari, he painted allegorical figures. In a further Naples Exposition, he exhibited among others: Un cliente di merito, a Pompeian Scene, and Un negoziante di stoffe. He was named director of the Institute of the Royal School of Painting in Urbino. He painted a canvas of the Madonna del Carmelo (1913) for the Chapel of Anime Santa in Trepuzzi, in Province of Lecce. His paintings recall the influence of Filippo Palizzi.

== Death ==
He died at Urbano in 1924.
