= Tolve =

- Comune
- Comune di Tolve
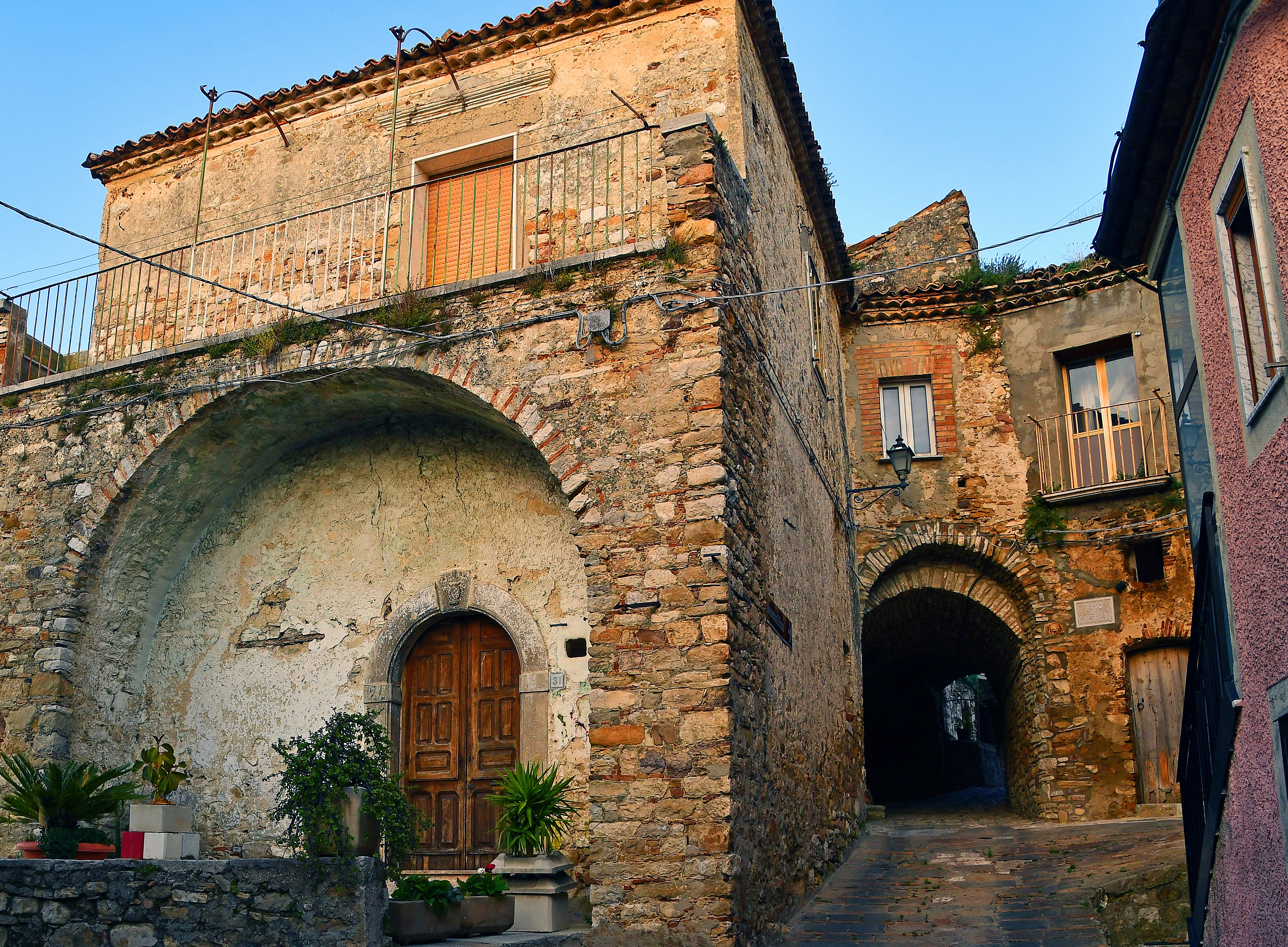
- View of Tolve

- Coat of arms

- Location within Italy Location within Basilicata
- Coordinates: 40°42′N 16°01′E
- Country: Italy
- Region: Basilicata
- Province: Potenza (PZ)

Government
  - Mayor: Pasquale Pepe (since 2020)

Area
  - Total: 127 km^{2} (49 sq mi)
- Elevation: 568 m (1,864 ft)

Population (April 2024)
  - Total: 2,926
  - Density: 23.0/km^{2} (59.7/sq mi)
- Demonym: Tolvesi
- Time zone: UTC+1 (CET)
  - Summer (DST): UTC+2 (CEST)
- Postal code: 85017
- Dialing code: 0971
- ISTAT code: 076090
- Patron saint: St. Roch
- Saint day: August 16 - September 16
- Website: www.comune.tolve.pz.it

Tolve is a town and comune in the province of Potenza, in the Southern Italian region of Basilicata.

== History ==
Remains of pre-historic (Neolithic) settlements have been found in the nearby. In early historic times, the area was inhabited town of the Lucani, as testified by a tomb of a rich warrior from the 7th or 6th century BC, a temple of Cybele and countryside villas. It is also likely that the Tolve area was abandoned after Hannibal's arrival in southern Italy, as the first following traces of human presence date to the 1st century BC. Tolve is mentioned for the first time in the Lombard Edictum Rothari.

In the Middle Ages Tolve grew around a castle with three towers, first under the Byzantines and then under the Normans, as part of the county of Tricarico. In 1250 it was held by Galvano, an uncle of King Manfred of Sicily. After the Angevine conquest of the Kingdom of Sicily, it was a center for production of fire weapons starting from the 16th century.

== International relations ==
=== Twin towns — Sister cities ===
Tolve is twinned with:

- Chieri, Italy
- Viggiano, Italy
