= Francesco Antonio Roberti =

Italian Roman Catholic prelate

Most Reverend Francesco Antonio Roberti
- Bishop of Alessano
- Church: Catholic Church
- Diocese: Diocese of Alessano
- In office: 1648–1653
- Predecessor: Placido Padiglia
- Successor: Giovanni Granafei

Orders
- Consecration: 30 November 1648 by Marcello Lante della Rovere

Personal details
- Born: 1593 Cupertino, Italy
- Died: 1653 (age 60) Alessano, Italy

Francesco Antonio Roberti (1593–1653) was a Roman Catholic prelate who served as Bishop of Alessano (1648–1653).

== Biography ==
Francesco Antonio Roberti was born in 1593 in Cupertino, Italy. On 23 November 1648, he was appointed during the papacy of Pope Innocent X as Bishop of Alessano. On 30 November 1648, he was consecrated bishop by Marcello Lante della Rovere, Cardinal-Bishop of Ostia e Velletri, with Giovan Battista Foppa, Archbishop of Benevento, and Enea di Cesare Spennazzi, Bishop of Ferentino, serving as co-consecrators. He served as Bishop of Alessano until his death in 1653.

== External links and additional sources ==
- Cheney, David M. "Diocese of Alessano". Catholic-Hierarchy.org. (for Chronology of Bishops) ^{[self-published]}
- Chow, Gabriel. "Titular Episcopal See of Alessano (Italy)". GCatholic.org. (for Chronology of Bishops) ^{[self-published]}

Catholic Church titles
| Preceded by Placido Padiglia | Bishop of Alessano; 1648–1653 | Succeeded by Giovanni Granafei |
