= Enea di Cesare Spennazzi =

Italian Roman Catholic prelate (died 1658)

Most Reverend Enea di Cesare Spennazzi
- Bishop of Ferentino
- Church: Catholic Church
- Diocese: Diocese of Ferentino
- In office: 1644–1658
- Predecessor: Ennio Filonardi (bishop)
- Successor: Ottavio Roncioni
- Previous post: Bishop of Sovana (1638–1644)

Orders
- Consecration: 21 December 1638 by Alessandro Cesarini (iuniore)

Personal details
- Died: 1658 Ferentino, Italy

Enea di Cesare Spennazzi (died 1658) was a Roman Catholic prelate who served as Bishop of Ferentino (1644–1658) and Bishop of Sovana (1638–1644).

== Biography ==
On 20 December 1638, Enea di Cesare Spennazzi was appointed Bishop of Sovana by Pope Urban VIII. On 21 December 1638, he was consecrated bishop by Alessandro Cesarini (iuniore), Cardinal-Deacon of Sant'Eustachio, with Tommaso Carafa, Bishop Emeritus of Vulturara e Montecorvino, and Giovanni Battista Altieri, Bishop Emeritus of Camerino, serving as co-consecrators.

On 23 May 1644, he was transferred to the diocese of Ferentino by Pope Urban VIII. He served as Bishop of Ferentino until his death in 1658.

== Episcopal succession ==
While bishop, he was the principal co-consecrator of:

- Franciscus Perrone, Bishop of Caiazzo (1648);
- Francesco Antonio Roberti, Bishop of Alessano (1648);
- Pirro Luigi Castellomata, Bishop of Ascoli Satriano (1648);
- Agostino Barbosa, Bishop of Ugento (1649);
- Giovanni Antonio Capobianco, Bishop of Siracusa (1649);
- Paolo Teutonico, Archbishop of Manfredonia (1649); and
- Gian Giacomo Cristoforo, Bishop of Lacedonia (1649).

== External links and additional sources ==
- Cheney, David M. "Diocese of Pitigliano-Sovana-Orbetello". Catholic-Hierarchy.org. (for Chronology of Bishops) ^{[self-published]}
- Chow, Gabriel. "Diocese of Pitigliano-Sovana-Orbetello (Italy)". GCatholic.org. (for Chronology of Bishops) ^{[self-published]}
- Cheney, David M. "Diocese of Ferentino". Catholic-Hierarchy.org. (for Chronology of Bishops) ^{[self-published]}
- Chow, Gabriel. "Diocese of Ferentino (Italy)". GCatholic.org. (for Chronology of Bishops) ^{[self-published]}

Catholic Church titles
Preceded by Cristoforo Tolomei	Bishop of Sovana; 1638–1644	Succeeded by Marcello Cervini
Preceded by Ennio Filonardi	Bishop of Ferentino; 1644–1658	Succeeded by Ottavio Roncioni
