= Francesco Antonio Balduini =

Italian Roman Catholic prelate

Most Reverend Francesco Antonio Balduini
- Bishop of Alessano
- Church: Catholic Church
- Diocese: Diocese of Alessano
- In office: 1531–1539
- Predecessor: Alessandro Cesarini
- Successor: Benedetto de Sanctis

Personal details
- Died: 1539 Alessano, Italy

Francesco Antonio Balduini (died 1539) was a Roman Catholic prelate who served as Bishop of Alessano (1531–1539).

== Biography ==
On 15 November 1531, Francesco Antonio Balduini was appointed during the papacy of Pope Clement VII as Bishop of Alessano. He served as Bishop of Alessano until his death in 1539.

== External links and additional sources ==
- Cheney, David M. "Diocese of Alessano". Catholic-Hierarchy.org. (for Chronology of Bishops) ^{[self-published]}
- Chow, Gabriel. "Titular Episcopal See of Alessano (Italy)". GCatholic.org. (for Chronology of Bishops) ^{[self-published]}

Catholic Church titles
Preceded by Alessandro Cesarini	Bishop of Alessano; 1531–1539	Succeeded by Benedetto de Sanctis
