= Placido Padiglia =

17th and 18th-century Italian Catholic bishop

Most Reverend Placido Padiglia
- Bishop of Alessano
- Church: Catholic Church
- Diocese: Diocese of Alessano
- In office: 1634–1648
- Predecessor: Nicola Antonio Spinelli
- Successor: Francesco Antonio Roberti
- Previous post: Bishop of Lavello (1627–1634)

Orders
- Consecration: 26 September 1627 by Guido Bentivoglio d'Aragona

Personal details
- Born: 1579 Naples, Italy
- Died: 14 June 1648 (age 69) Alessano, Italy

Placido Padiglia, O.S.B. Cel. (1579 – 14 June 1648) was a Roman Catholic priest and prelate whose career culminated in his service as the Bishop of the Italian dioceses of Lavello from 1627 to 1634, and Alessano, from 1634 to 1648 (prior to the reorganization of these positions and dioceses into other dioceses).

== Biography ==
Placido Padiglia was born in Naples, Italy, sometime in 1579. He was ordained as a priest in the Celestine Order of Saint Benedict at some point during his adulthood. On 20 September 1627, during the papacy of Pope Urban VIII, Padiglia was appointed as Bishop of Lavello. On 26 September 1627, he was consecrated bishop by Guido Bentivoglio d'Aragona, Cardinal-Priest of Santa Maria del Popolo, along with Girolamo de Franchis, Bishop of Nardò, and Francesco Maria Brancaccio, Bishop of Capaccio, serving as co-consecrators. On 27 November 1634, he was appointed during the papacy of Pope Urban VIII as Bishop of Alessano. Padiglia went on to serve as Bishop of Alessano until his death on 14 June 1648.

In 1645, while bishop of Alessano, Padiglia served as the principal co-consecrator of Jacobus Wemmers, for his role as Titular Bishop for the Egyptian city of Memphis.

== External links and additional sources ==
- Cheney, David M. "Diocese of Lavello". Catholic-Hierarchy.org. (Chronology of Bishops) ^{[self-published]}
- Chow, Gabriel. "Titular Episcopal See of Lavello". GCatholic.org. (Chronology of Bishops) ^{[self-published]}
- Cheney, David M. "Diocese of Alessano". Catholic-Hierarchy.org. (for Chronology of Bishops) ^{[self-published]}
- Chow, Gabriel. "Titular Episcopal See of Alessano (Italy)". GCatholic.org. (for Chronology of Bishops) ^{[self-published]}

Catholic Church titles
Preceded by Fabio Olivadisi	Bishop of Lavello; 1627–1634	Succeeded by Cherubino Manzoni
Preceded by Nicola Antonio Spinelli	Bishop of Alessano; 1634–1648	Succeeded by Francesco Antonio Roberti
