= Giovanni Giacomo del Balzo =

Italian Roman Catholic prelate

Most Reverend Giovanni Giacomo del Balzo
- Bishop of Alessano
- Church: Catholic Church
- Diocese: Diocese of Alessano
- In office: 1488–1512
- Predecessor: Benedetto del Balzo
- Successor: Giovanni Antonio Acquaviva d'Aragona

Personal details
- Died: 1512 Alessano, Italy

Giovanni Giacomo del Balzo (died 1512) was a Roman Catholic prelate who served as Bishop of Alessano (1488–1512).

== Biography ==
In 1488, Giovanni Giacomo del Balzo was appointed during the papacy of Pope Innocent VIII as Bishop of Alessano. He served as Bishop of Alessano until his death in 1512.

== See also ==
- Catholic Church in Italy

== External links and additional sources ==
- Cheney, David M. "Diocese of Alessano". Catholic-Hierarchy.org. (for Chronology of Bishops) ^{[self-published]}
- Chow, Gabriel. "Titular Episcopal See of Alessano (Italy)". GCatholic.org. (for Chronology of Bishops) ^{[self-published]}

Catholic Church titles
Preceded by Benedetto del Balzo	Bishop of Alessano; 1488–1512	Succeeded by Giovanni Antonio Acquaviva d'Aragona
