= Giovanni Carlo Antonelli =

Italian Roman Catholic prelate

Most Reverend Giovanni Carlo Antonelli
- Bishop of Ferentino
- Church: Catholic Church
- Diocese: Diocese of Ferentino
- In office: 1677–1694
- Predecessor: Ottavio Roncioni
- Successor: Valeriano Chierichelli

Orders
- Ordination: 29 July 1635
- Consecration: 24 January 1677 by Fabrizio Spada

Personal details
- Born: 1612 Velletri, Italy
- Died: 20 April 1694 (age 82) Ferentino, Italy

Giovanni Carlo Antonelli (1612 – 20 April 1694) was a Roman Catholic prelate who served as Bishop of Ferentino (1677–1694).

== Biography ==
Giovanni Carlo Antonelli was born in Velletri, Italy in 1612 and ordained a priest on 29 July 1635. On 11 January 1677, he was appointed during the papacy of Pope Innocent XI as Bishop of Ferentino. On 24 January 1677, he was consecrated bishop by Fabrizio Spada, Cardinal-Priest of San Callisto, with Francesco Casati, Titular Archbishop of Trapezus, and Domenico Gianuzzi, Titular Bishop of Dioclea in Phrygia, serving as co-consecrators. He served as Bishop of Ferentino until his death on 20 April 1694.

== See also ==
- Catholic Church in Italy

== External links and additional sources ==
- Cheney, David M. "Diocese of Ferentino". Catholic-Hierarchy.org. (for Chronology of Bishops) ^{[self-published]}
- Chow, Gabriel. "Diocese of Ferentino (Italy)". GCatholic.org. (for Chronology of Bishops) ^{[self-published]}

Catholic Church titles
Preceded by Ottavio Roncioni	Bishop of Ferentino; 1677–1694	Succeeded by Valeriano Chierichelli
