= Montesardo =

Village in Lecce, Italy

- Frazione
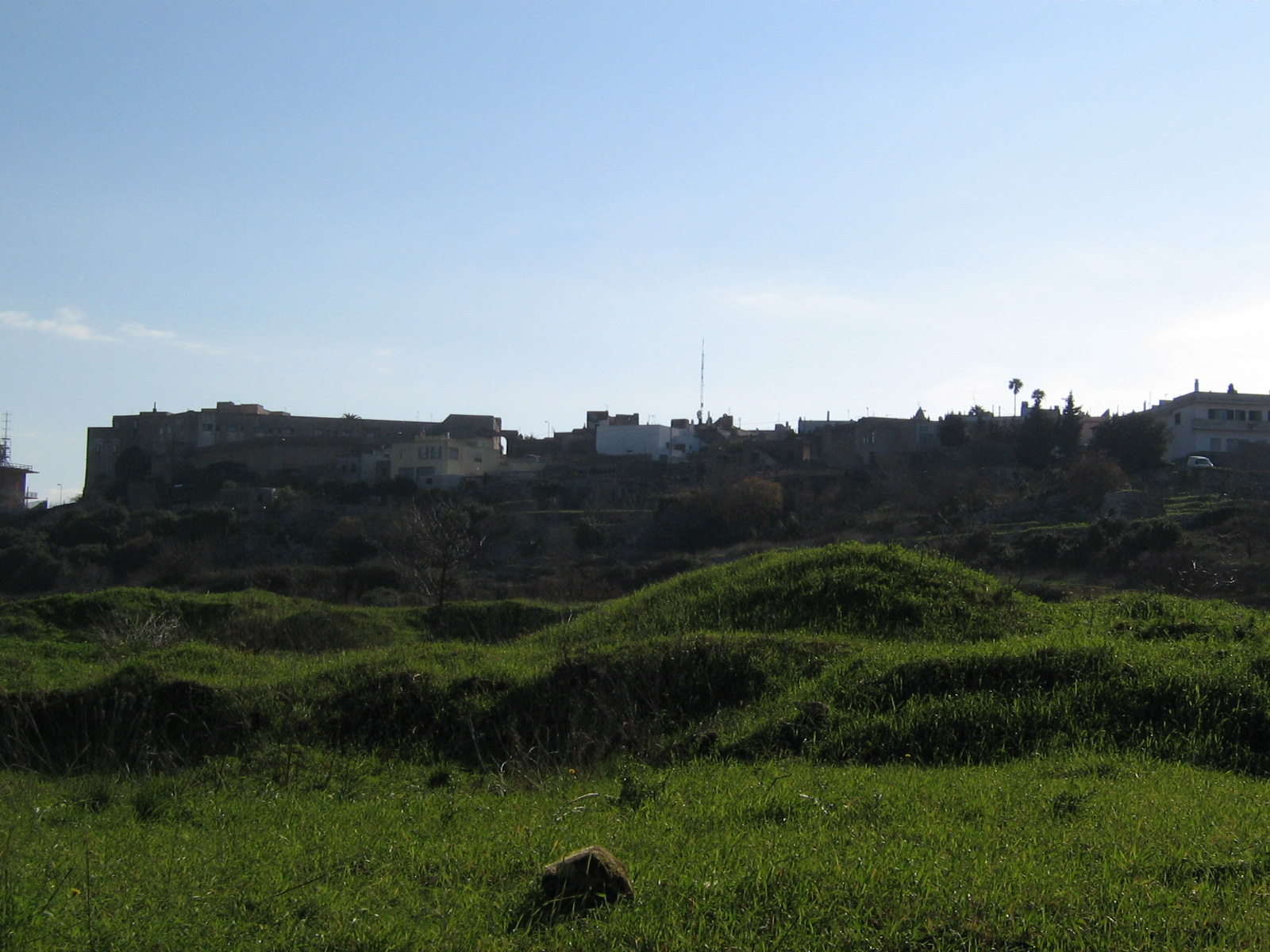
- Panoramic view of Montesardo

- Location of Montesardo in Italy
- Coordinates: 39°52′32.59″N 18°20′22.81″E
- Country: Italy
- Region: Apulia
- Province: Lecce
- Comune: Alessano
- Elevation: 184 m (604 ft)

Population (2001)
  - Total: 1,369
- Demonym: Montesardesi
- Time zone: UTC+1 (CET)
  - Summer (DST): UTC+2 (CEST)
- Postal code: 73031
- Dialing code: 0833
- Patron saint: Anthony of Padua
- Saint day: 13 June

Montesardo is a frazione (transl. village) in the comune of Alessano in the province of Lecce in the Apulia region, Italy. As of the 2001 census, it has a population of 1,369. It is 59 km (37 mi) from Lecce, just over 10 km (6.2 mi) from Leuca, and 1 km (0.62 mi) from the comune capital of Alessano.

== Geography ==
=== Territory ===
The village is located 184 m (604 ft) above sea level. Montesardo is the third highest area in the province of Lecce after Serra dei Cianci and Monte Sant'Eleuterio. The village developed on the southern continuation of the Serra dei Cianci mountain, so the village is sometimes referred to as "Serra di Montesardo". Montesardo is crossed by state highway 275 (SS 275) of Santa Maria di Leuca.

=== Climate ===
Montesardo has a Mediterranean climate, with mild winters and hot summers. The coldest month is January, with an average temperature of 9 °C (48 °F), and the hottest month is August, with an average temperature of 25.1 °C (77.2 °F). The average amount of rainfall per year is 676 mm (26.6 in). Rainfall is at a minimum during spring and summer and peaks during autumn and winter.

The comunes of lower Salento, including Montesardo, are weakly affected by winds due to protection from Serre Salentine (Salento greenhouses) – elevated areas that create a shield system.

Climate data for Lower Salento
| Month | Jan | Feb | Mar | Apr | May | Jun | Jul | Aug | Sep | Oct | Nov | Dec | Year |
|---|---|---|---|---|---|---|---|---|---|---|---|---|---|
| Mean daily maximum °F | 54.3 | 55.4 | 58.6 | 64.6 | 72.7 | 80.6 | 85.6 | 86.0 | 79.5 | 71.1 | 63.3 | 57.4 | 69.1 |
| Daily mean °F | 48.2 | 48.9 | 52.0 | 57.0 | 64.2 | 71.8 | 76.6 | 77.2 | 71.4 | 63.9 | 56.7 | 51.3 | 61.6 |
| Mean daily minimum °F | 42.1 | 42.4 | 45.1 | 49.3 | 55.9 | 63.0 | 67.6 | 68.2 | 63.3 | 56.7 | 50.2 | 45.1 | 54.1 |
| Average rainfall inches | 3.1 | 2.4 | 2.8 | 1.6 | 1.1 | 0.8 | 0.6 | 0.8 | 2.1 | 3.8 | 4.3 | 3.3 | 26.7 |
| Mean daily maximum °C | 12.4 | 13.0 | 14.8 | 18.1 | 22.6 | 27.0 | 29.8 | 30.0 | 26.4 | 21.7 | 17.4 | 14.1 | 20.6 |
| Daily mean °C | 9.0 | 9.4 | 11.1 | 13.9 | 17.9 | 22.1 | 24.8 | 25.1 | 21.9 | 17.7 | 13.7 | 10.7 | 16.4 |
| Mean daily minimum °C | 5.6 | 5.8 | 7.3 | 9.6 | 13.3 | 17.2 | 19.8 | 20.1 | 17.4 | 13.7 | 10.1 | 7.3 | 12.3 |
| Average rainfall mm | 80 | 60 | 70 | 40 | 29 | 21 | 14 | 21 | 53 | 96 | 109 | 83 | 676 |

== History ==
Records of Montesardo begin in the 16th century. In his work De situ Japigiae, Italian scholar Galateo describes an "oppidum mediocris magnitudinis" with a large circular wall and visible ruins of ancient houses located on a hill called "Mons Arduus", about seven miles away from Leuca. Galateo also recalls that the town was called "tracheion oros" by the Greeks, interpreted in Latin as "Mons asper" or "arduus", meaning steep or rugged mountain.

In the 19th century, historian Luigi Tasselli, in his work Antichità di Leuca (Antiquity of Leuca), hypothesized a Greek origin of the city based on Galateo's writing; in La corografia fisica e storica di Terra d'Otranto (The physical and historical chorography of Terra d'Otranto), he stated that the Byzantine Greeks would then have translated the Latin name into "trachina", i.e. the "tracheion oros" referred to by Galateo. Over time, the area would have taken the name "Monsarduus" from Latin, from which the current name of Montesardo would have derived.

It was previously hypothesized that there may have been an earlier ancient settlement at the site of the current inhabited area of Montesardo based on aerial photos and a reconnaissance of the terrain which revealed a defensive route of about 3.6 km (2.2 mi) in length. Archaeological research has since identified traces that confirm the existence of this settlement. A hint of the presence of an ancient settlement in the area was given when a tomb was found in 1953 in a rocky bank in Alessano. In 1997, the first systematic excavation was carried out, which revealed the remains of a large building that had been built with blocks of tuff. During construction excavations near the Romasi Castle in the second half of the 1980s, ceramic material was recovered, giving an indication of a population in the area between the 9th and the 1st century BC. Additionally, a stretch of wall at the base of the Romasi castle, estimated to have been built between the 4th and 3rd centuries BC, uses a stone building technique also found in the nearby city of Vereto.

After the fall of the Western Roman Empire, Montesardo was used as a fortress due to its bastions, fortified castle, and circle of walls interspersed with towers. These walls and towers were demolished in 1867. Montesardo was also a seat of important schools of mathematics, philosophy, and music. During World War II, the land was occupied by German troops.

== Places of interest ==
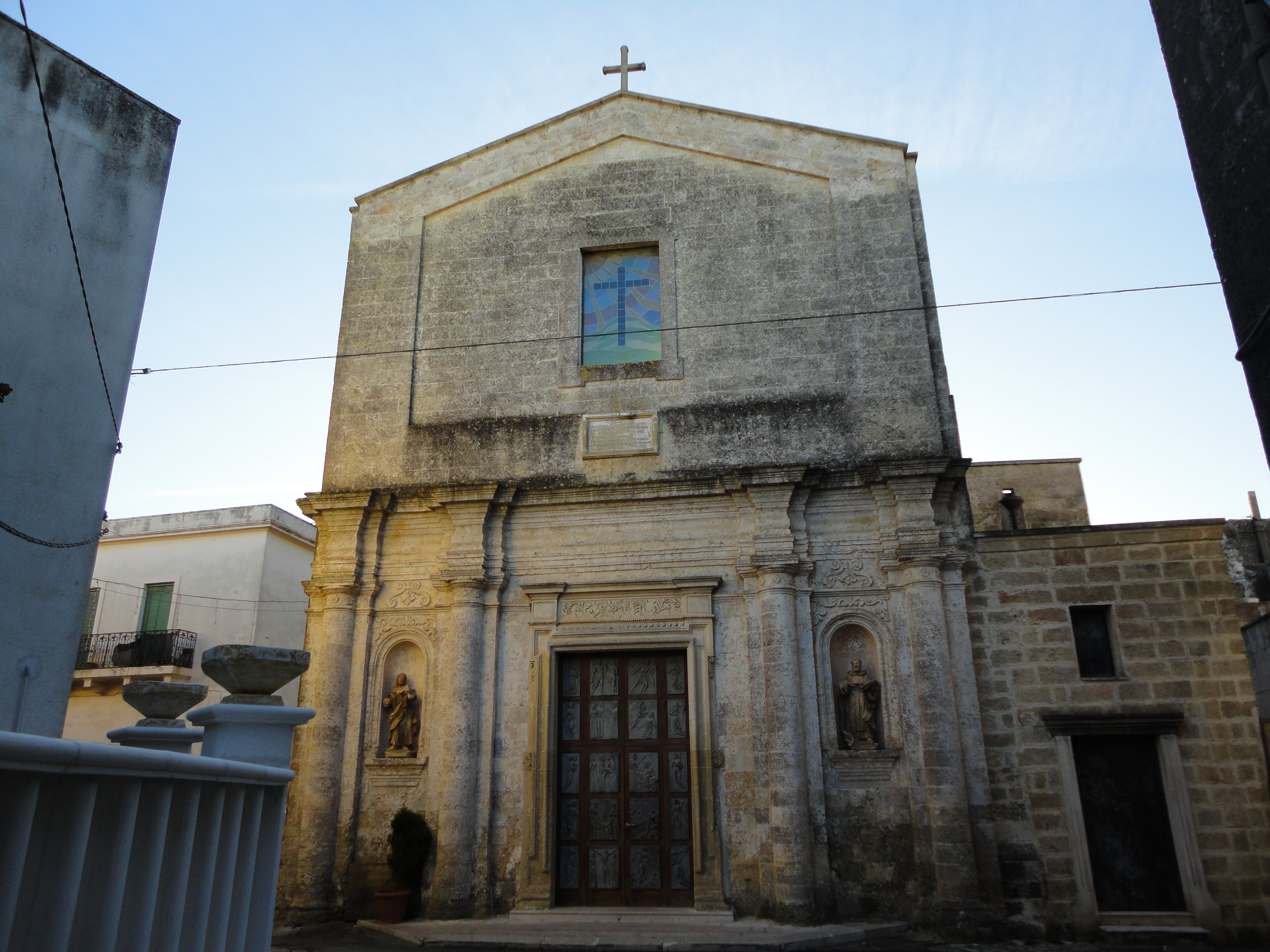
Mother Church

=== Mother Church ===
The Mother Church (Chiesa Madre), dedicated to the Presentation of the Blessed Virgin Mary, was built in 1727 at the wish of Fulvio Gennaro Caracciolo (1675–1745), the 3rd Duke of Montesardo. It stands on the site of a pre-existing building that dates back to the 16–17th centuries.

The church is separated into two levels by an architrave. On the lower level, two alcoves at the side of the framed entrance portal house statues in lecce stone, a type of limestone found in the Salento region. On the south-facing exterior, there is a large fresco depicting Saint Christopher. On the upper level, there is a rectangular stained glass window depicting a cross. Inside, there are some baroque altars with paintings and statues above them. There is also an organ and a pulpit dating back to the 18th century.

=== Church of Saint Barbara ===
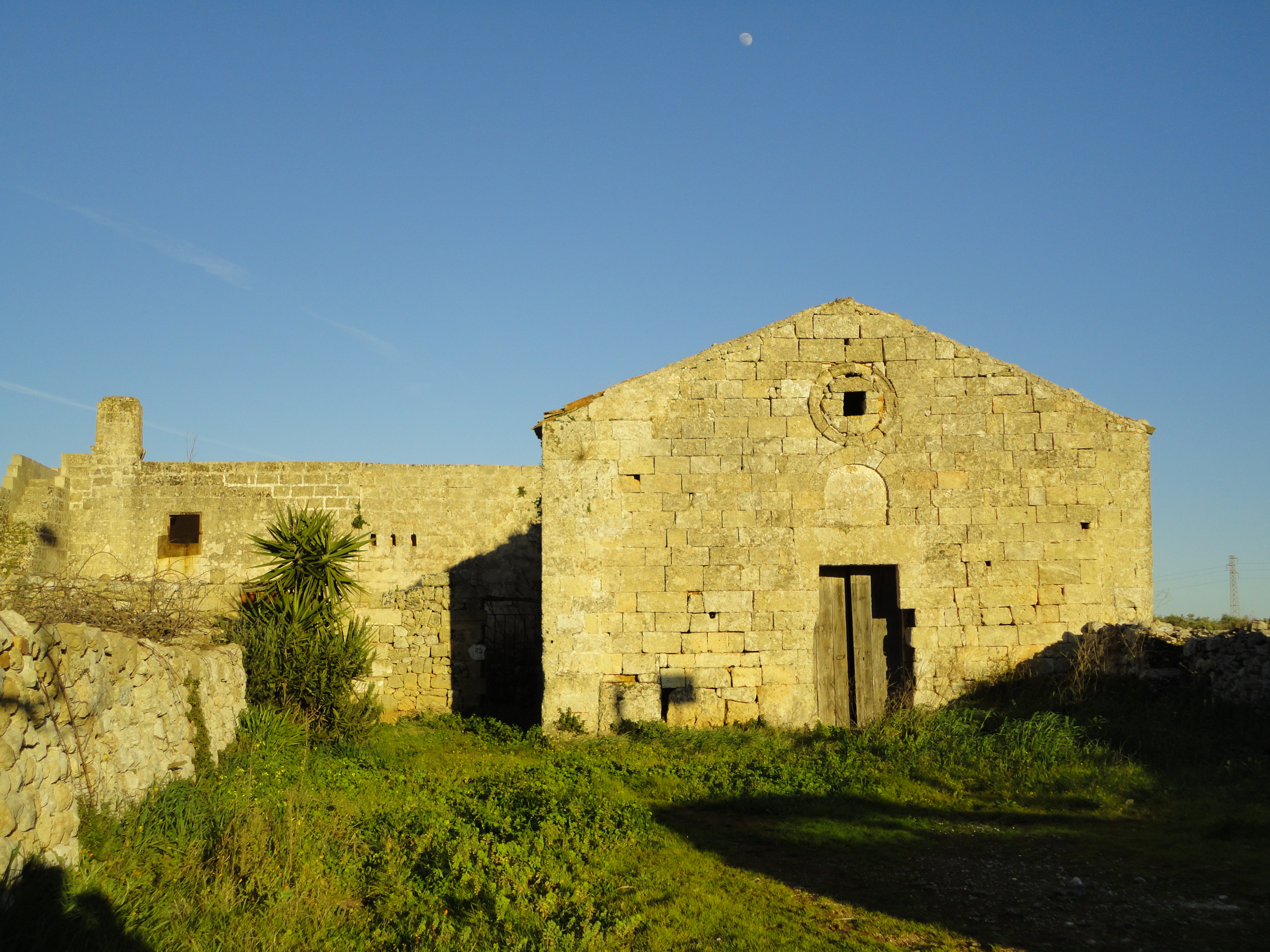
Church of Saint Barbara

The Church of Saint Barbara (Chiesa di Santa Barbara), which dates back to the 13th century, was annexed to the female monastery of the Benedictines. It has been almost completely destroyed and is used today for agricultural purposes.

The church has a small rose window with a lunette below it. The interior is a single room that preserves traces of ancient frescoes that once covered the entire inside of the structure. The frescoes depict the Byzantine era to the 15th century. A depiction of Saint Barbara can be seen holding a tower in her right hand, an iconographic symbol of the saint. There is also a 14th-century deesis, although it is missing the figure of St. John the Baptist.

It is uncertain when the church was abandoned. Bishop Ercole Lamia did not include it in the report of his pastoral visit to Montesardo in 1590. However, it was still frequented by the faithful until the 18th century. The building is now private property and used for agricultural purposes.

=== Church of the Immaculate Conception ===
The Church of the Immaculate Conception (Chiesa dell'Immacolata) dates back to 1870. It was built soon after the proclamation of the dogma of the Immaculate Conception. On the lunette, there is a frescoed scene of the Passion of Christ.

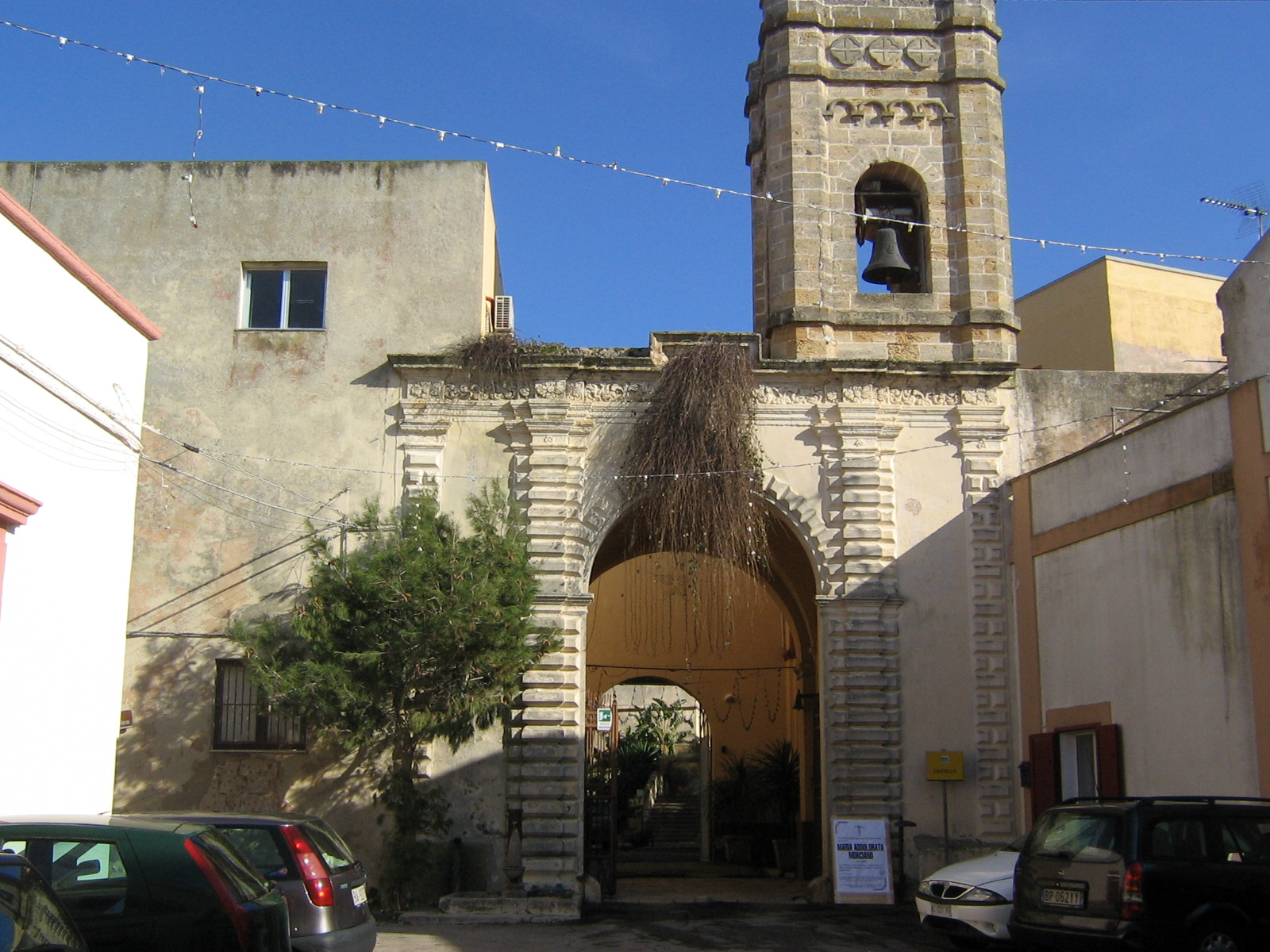
Castle

=== Castle ===
The castle is located in the old town center. It is said to have been commissioned by the Caracciolo family or those related to the Orsini family. It was built between the 15th and 16th centuries. Over time, the original layout has been considerably changed as the building has undergone significant transformations.

The layout of the building is square in shape with four towers at the corners, also square-shaped. A fence runs along the perimeter. Inside, there is a square, once used for military purposes, that is overlooked by all rooms of the castle. The square was originally connected to the outside by a drawbridge, which has since been replaced by a hybrid masonry connection. The walls have a slightly protruding parapet decorated with corbels.

In the 20th century, the castle was bought by the Romasi barons. After World War II, it was passed from the family to the Vocationist Fathers, who today manage the building as a retirement home for the elderly.

== Events ==
- Fair of Saint Stephen (Fiera di Santo Stefano) – a trade fair that occurs on the first Monday after Easter Monday
- Feast of Saint Anthony (Festa di Sant'Antonio) – occurs on the second Sunday of July, on or around the feast day of Anthony of Padua
- "Sagra de la pasta fatta a casa e de lu porcu paesanu pri-pri" – occurs annually on 12 August. A food festival with homemade pasta and pork prepared according to traditional Salento recipes. Dishes include porchetta (known in Montesardo as pri-pri), marenna (a mixture of fried bread, turnips, and chickpeas), lu ranu passatu, pettole (leavened and fried dough; pittule in the local dialect), fritta, foje reste (wild chicory), and zavirne (wild vegetables). The food is served with de la Parduidda, a local wine produced from Salento grapes
