= Ennio Filonardi (bishop of Ferentino) =

Most Reverend Ennio Filonardi
- Bishop of Ferentino
- Church: Catholic Church
- Diocese: Diocese of Ferentino
- In office: 1612–1644
- Predecessor: Dionigi Morelli
- Successor: Enea di Cesare Spennazzi

Orders
- Consecration: 30 November 1612 by Giovanni Garzia Mellini

Personal details
- Born: 1568 Verulan
- Died: 1644 (age 76) Ferentino, Italy

Ennio Filonardi (1568–1644) was a Roman Catholic prelate who served as Bishop of Ferentino (1612–1644).

== Biography ==
Ennio Filonardi was born in Verulan in 1568. On 19 November 1612, he was appointed during the papacy of Pope Paul V as Bishop of Ferentino. On 30 November 1612, he was consecrated bishop by Giovanni Garzia Mellini, Cardinal-Priest of Santi Quattro Coronati with Giovanni Battista Salvago, Bishop of Luni e Sarzana, and Antonio Seneca, Bishop of Anagni, serving as co-consecrators. He served as Bishop of Ferentino until his death in 1644.

While bishop, he was the principal co-consecrator of Camillo Moro, Bishop of Termoli (1612); and Alessandro Filonardi, Bishop of Aquino (1615).

== External links and additional sources ==
- Cheney, David M. "Diocese of Ferentino". Catholic-Hierarchy.org. (for Chronology of Bishops) ^{[self-published]}
- Chow, Gabriel. "Diocese of Ferentino (Italy)". GCatholic.org. (for Chronology of Bishops) ^{[self-published]}

Catholic Church titles
Preceded by Dionigi Morelli	Bishop of Ferentino; 1612–1644	Succeeded by Enea di Cesare Spennazzi
