= Leonardo de Magistris =

Italian Roman Catholic prelate

Most Reverend Leonardo de Magistris
- Bishop of Alessano
- Church: Catholic Church
- Diocese: Diocese of Alessano
- In office: 1551–1554
- Predecessor: Annibale Magalotti
- Successor: Giulio Galletti
- Previous post: Bishop of Capri (1540–1551)

Personal details
- Died: 1554 Alessano, Italy

Leonardo de Magistris (died 1554) was a Roman Catholic prelate who served as Bishop of Alessano (1551–1554) and Bishop of Capri (1540–1551).

== Biography ==
On 13 February 1540, Leonardo de Magistris was appointed during the papacy of Pope Paul III as Bishop of Capri. On 21 August 1551, he was appointed during the papacy of Pope Julius III as Bishop of Alessano. He served as Bishop of Alessano until his death in 1554.

== External links and additional sources ==
- Cheney, David M. "Diocese of Capri". Catholic-Hierarchy.org. (for Chronology of Bishops) ^{[self-published]}
- Chow, Gabriel. "Titular Episcopal See of Capri (Italy)". GCatholic.org. (for Chronology of Bishops) ^{[self-published]}
- Cheney, David M. "Diocese of Alessano". Catholic-Hierarchy.org. (for Chronology of Bishops) ^{[self-published]}
- Chow, Gabriel. "Titular Episcopal See of Alessano (Italy)". GCatholic.org. (for Chronology of Bishops) ^{[self-published]}

Catholic Church titles
Preceded by Angelo Baretta	Bishop of Capri; 1540–1551	Succeeded by Alfonso de Valdecabras
Preceded by Annibale Magalotti	Bishop of Alessano; 1551–1554	Succeeded by Giulio Galletti
