= Fabrizio Campani =

Roman Catholic prelate

Most Reverend Fabrizio Campani
- Bishop of Ferentino
- Church: Catholic Church
- In office: 1603–1605
- Predecessor: Orazio Ciceroni
- Successor: Dionigi Morelli

Orders
- Consecration: 20 April 1603 by Camillo Borghese

Personal details
- Died: 15 June 1605 Ferentino, Italy

Fabrizio Campani (also Fabrizio Capanus) (died 15 June 1605) was a Roman Catholic prelate who served as Bishop of Ferentino (1603–1605).

== Biography ==
On 7 April 1603, Fabrizio Campani was appointed during the papacy of Pope Clement VIII as Bishop of Ferentino. On 20 April 1603, he was consecrated bishop by Camillo Borghese, Cardinal-Priest of San Crisogono, with Leonard Abel, Titular Bishop of Sidon, and Hippolytus Manari, Bishop of Montepeloso, serving as co-consecrators. He served as Bishop of Ferentino until his death on 15 June 1605.

== See also ==
- Catholic Church in Italy

== External links and additional sources ==
- Cheney, David M. "Diocese of Ferentino". Catholic-Hierarchy.org. (for Chronology of Bishops) ^{[self-published]}
- Chow, Gabriel. "Diocese of Ferentino (Italy)". GCatholic.org. (for Chronology of Bishops) ^{[self-published]}

Catholic Church titles
Preceded by Orazio Ciceroni	Bishop of Ferentino; 1603–1605	Succeeded by Dionigi Morelli
