= Celso Mancini =

Roman Catholic prelate

Most Reverend Celso Mancini
- Bishop of Alessano
- Church: Catholic Church
- Diocese: Diocese of Alessano
- In office: 1597–1612
- Predecessor: Giulio Doffi
- Successor: Nicola Antonio Spinelli

Personal details
- Born: 1542
- Died: 1612 (age 70) Alessano, Italy

Celso Mancini (1542–1612) was a Roman Catholic prelate and Renaissance philosopher who served as Bishop of Alessano (1597–1612).

== Biography ==
Celso Mancini was born in Ravenna in 1542. In 1555 he assumed the habit of the Lateran Congregation of Canons Regular at Santa Maria di Porto in Ravenna. He was educated at the University of Padua, where he graduated in 1565. In 1590 he was appointed professor of moral philosophy at the University of Ferrara. He wrote extensively on philosophy, law, political theory and economics. On 14 April 1597, he was appointed during the papacy of Pope Clement VIII as Bishop of Alessano. He served as Bishop of Alessano until his death in 1612.

== Works ==
Mancini's principal work is De Juribus principatum, Libri novem (1596). The fifth book contains economic and financial matter of considerable merit. Mancini displays sound ideas on exchange and monetary economics. He distinguishes between the two duties of the state in reference to money, the care required for its maintenance, and the determination of its value, which both must correspond to the relations of the market. Mancini maintains the exclusive right of a prince to coin money, but he denies his right to debase it. Agreeing in this with other political writers of his day, Mancini regards it as the duty of a prince to maintain abundance in his dominions, exercising a paternal influence over them. The most important part of the fifth book is on finance, especially taxation. He enumerates the different taxes adopted in his day and proposes a rational classification of them, establishing the fundamental rules of finance, as the relation between taxes and the amount of public expenditure, and the proportion they should bear to the wealth of the citizens. Mancini's arguments throw considerable light on the subject of taxes, and indicate the first outlines of a doctrine which was developed much later.

== External links and additional sources ==
- "Mancini, Celso". Dictionary of Political Economy. Vol. 2. London: Macmillan and Company. 1894. p. 681.
- Rava, Luigi (1888). Celso Mancini filosofo e politico del secolo XVI. Saggio sulle dottrine politiche italiane. Bologna: Zanichelli.
- Celso Mancini entry (in Italian) in the Enciclopedia Treccani, 1934
- Cheney, David M. "Diocese of Alessano". Catholic-Hierarchy.org. (for Chronology of Bishops) ^{[self-published]}
- Chow, Gabriel. "Titular Episcopal See of Alessano (Italy)". GCatholic.org. (for Chronology of Bishops) ^{[self-published]}

Catholic Church titles
Preceded by Giulio Doffi	Bishop of Alessano; 1597–1612	Succeeded by Nicola Antonio Spinelli
