= Orazio Rapari =

Italian Roman Catholic prelate

Most Reverend Orazio Rapari
- Bishop of Alessano
- Church: Catholic Church
- Diocese: Diocese of Alessano
- In office: 1594–1595
- Predecessor: Sestilio Mazuca
- Successor: Giulio Doffi

Personal details
- Born: 1544
- Died: 1595 (age 51) Alessano, Italy

Orazio Rapari or Horatius Raparius (1544–1595) was a Roman Catholic prelate who served as Bishop of Alessano (1594–1595).

== Biography ==
On 3 October 1594, Orazio Rapari was appointed during the papacy of Pope Clement VIII as Bishop of Alessano. He served as Bishop of Alessano until his death in 1595.

== External links and additional sources ==
- Cheney, David M. "Diocese of Alessano". Catholic-Hierarchy.org. (for Chronology of Bishops) ^{[self-published]}
- Chow, Gabriel. "Titular Episcopal See of Alessano (Italy)". GCatholic.org. (for Chronology of Bishops) ^{[self-published]}

Catholic Church titles
Preceded by Sestilio Mazuca	Bishop of Alessano; 1592–1594	Succeeded by Giulio Doffi
