= Benedetto de Sanctis =

Roman Catholic prelate who served as Bishop of Alessano

Most Reverend Benedetto de Sanctis
- Bishop of Alessano
- Church: Catholic Church
- Diocese: Diocese of Alessano
- In office: 1540–1542
- Predecessor: Francesco Antonio Balduini
- Successor: Evangelista Cittadini

Personal details
- Died: 1542 Alessano, Italy

Benedetto de Sanctis (died 1542) was a Roman Catholic prelate who served as Bishop of Alessano (1540–1542).

== Biography ==
On 15 March 1540, Benedetto de Sanctis was appointed during the papacy of Pope Paul III as Bishop of Alessano. He served as Bishop of Alessano until his death in 1542.

== External links and additional sources ==
- Cheney, David M. "Diocese of Alessano". Catholic-Hierarchy.org. (for Chronology of Bishops) ^{[self-published]}
- Chow, Gabriel. "Titular Episcopal See of Alessano (Italy)". GCatholic.org. (for Chronology of Bishops) ^{[self-published]}

Catholic Church titles
Preceded by Francesco Antonio Balduini	Bishop of Alessano; 1540–1542	Succeeded by Evangelista Cittadini
