= Ferentino Cathedral =

Cathedral in Ferentino, Italy

Coordinates: 41.6932°N 13.2561°E

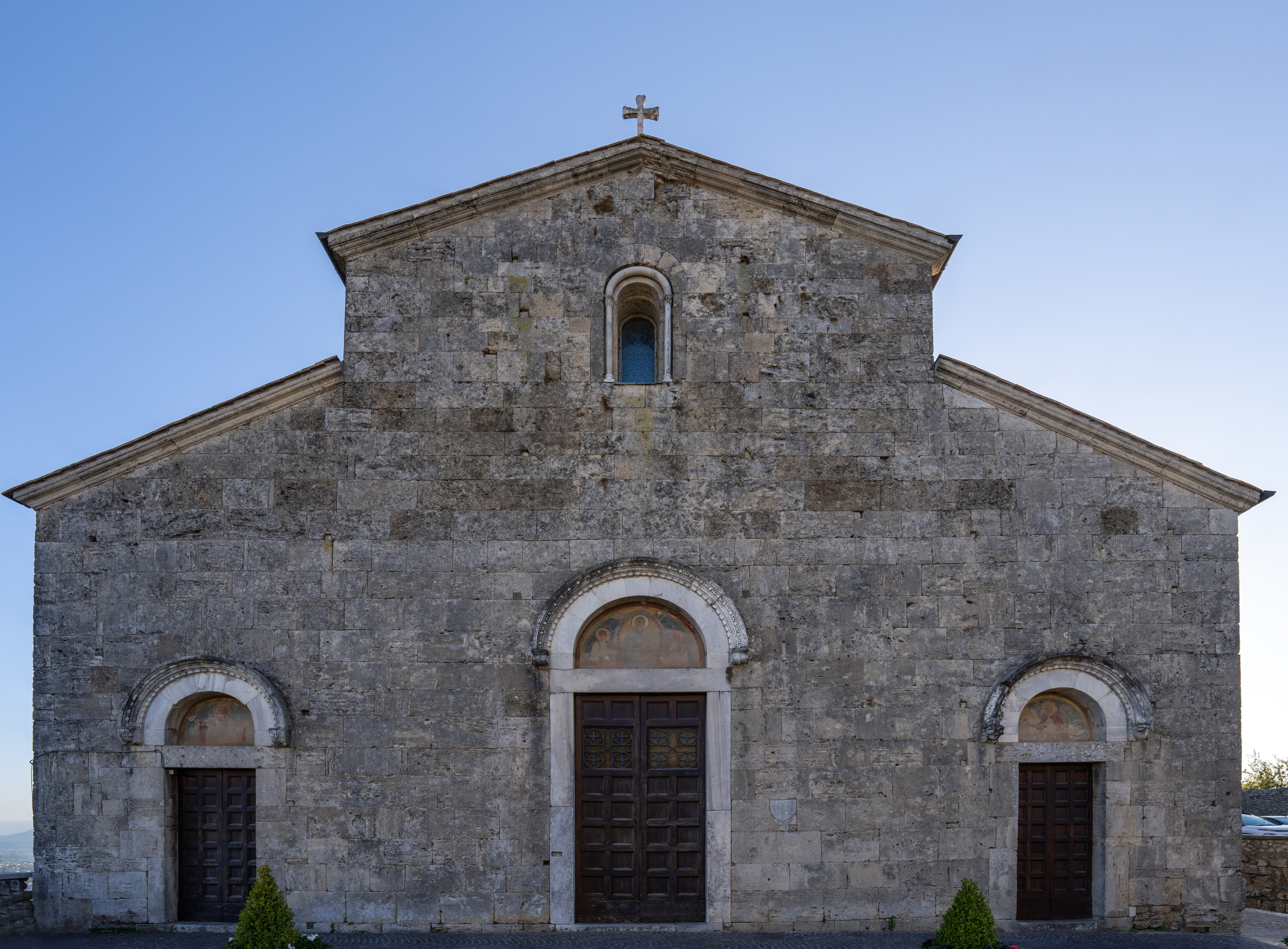
West front of the cathedral

Ferentino Cathedral (Italian: Duomo di Ferentino; Basilica Cattedrale dei Santi Giovanni e Paolo) is a Romanesque Roman Catholic cathedral in the town of Ferentino, Lazio, Italy, dedicated to Saints John and Paul, 2nd-century martyrs from Rome. Formerly the episcopal seat of the Diocese of Ferentino, it has been since 1986 a co-cathedral in the Diocese of Frosinone-Veroli-Ferentino.

== History and description ==
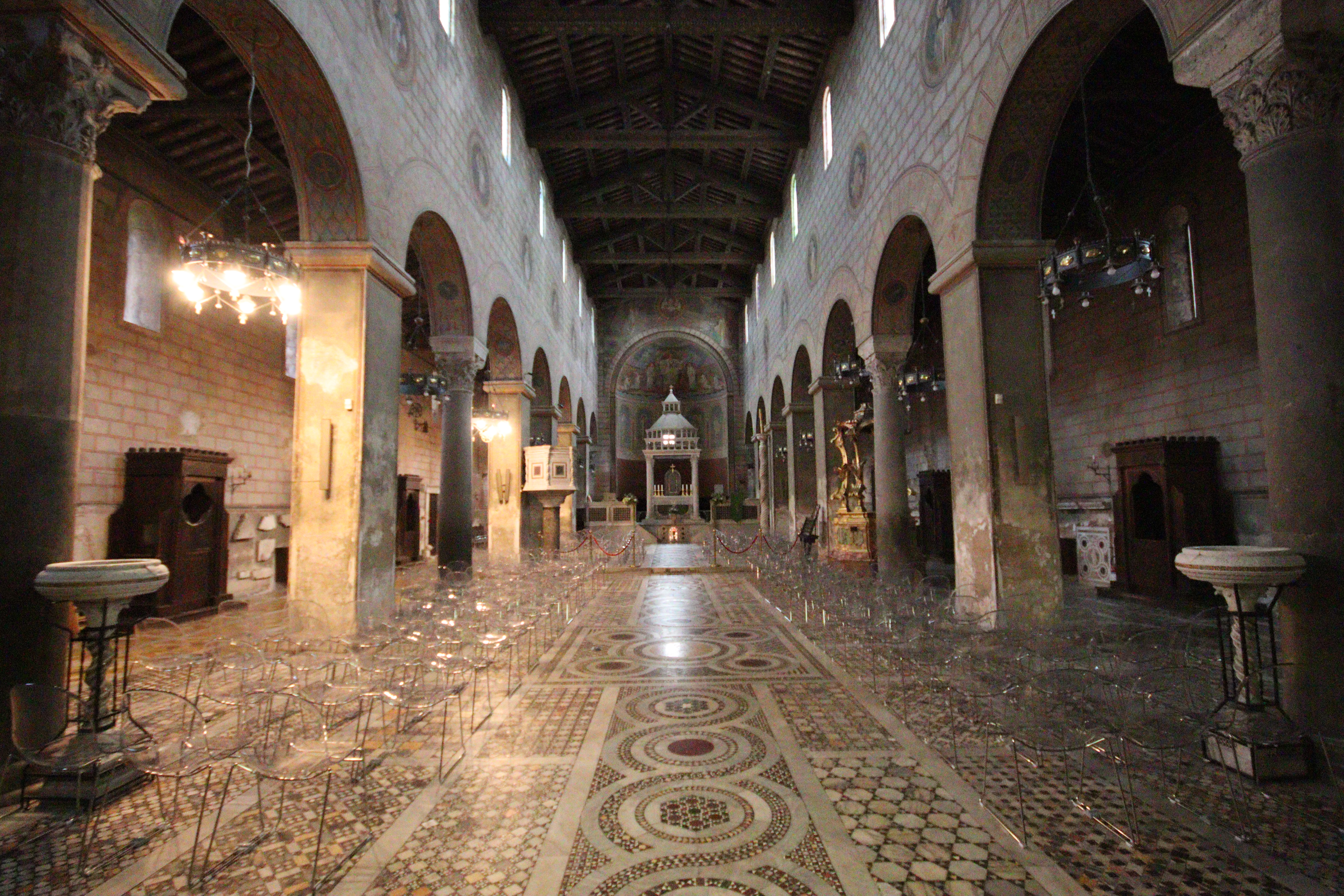
The Interior

The present cathedral stands on the site of the town's ancient acropolis. It was founded by Pope Paschal I in the early 9th century over the remains of a Roman temple. It was extensively refurbished under bishop Agostino of Ferentino. When the works were completed, in 1108, the relics of Saint Ambrose Centurion and Martyr, patron saint of the town of Ferentino, were moved here. The restored cathedral was dedicated on 13 June 1108.

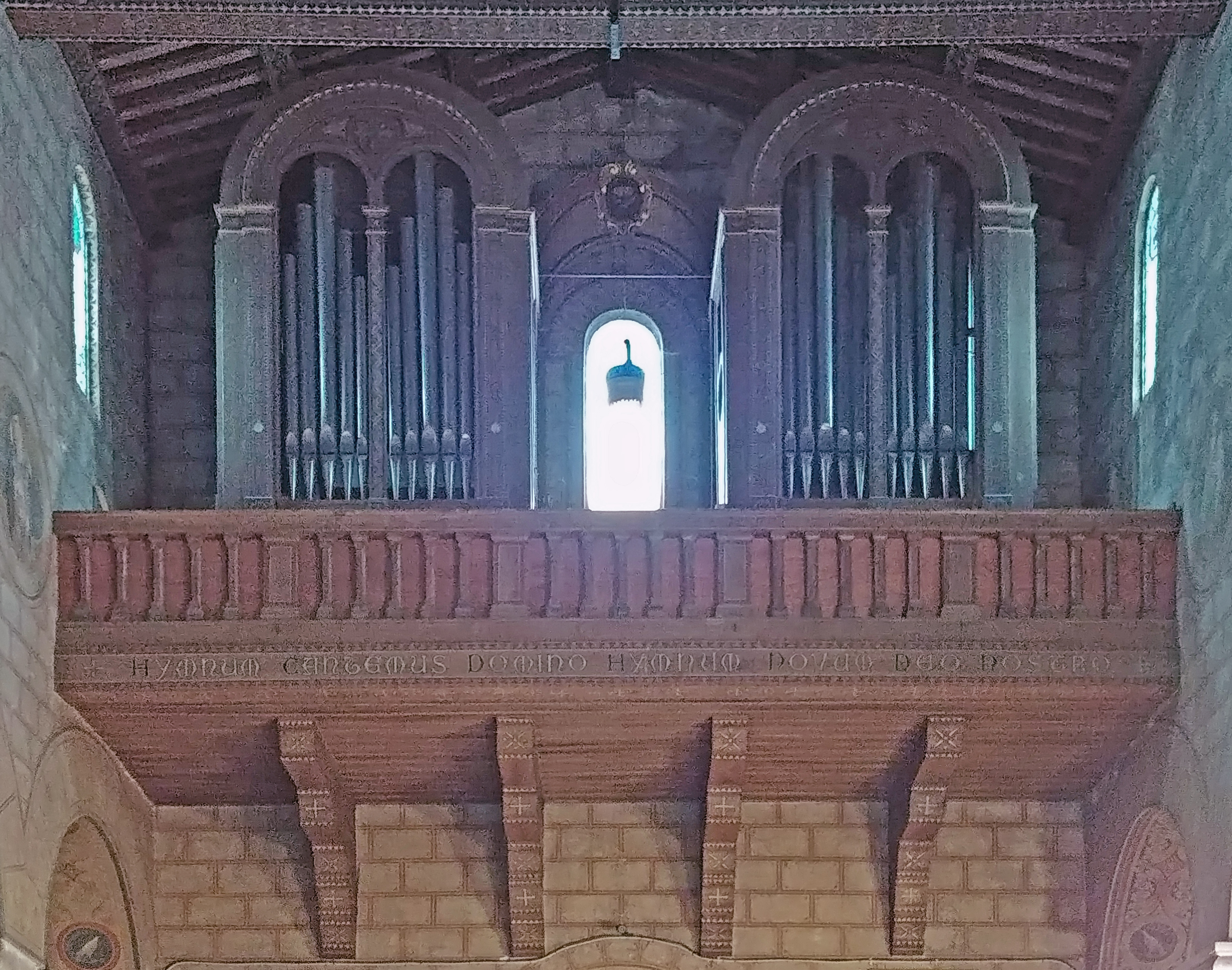
The pipe organ

The cathedral still contains some elements of the 9th-century church and 12th-century mosaics from the studio of the Cosmati. It also has a ciborium from the 13th century, by Trudo de Trivio. The interior contains serpentine columns attributed to Vassalletto and a canvas depicting the Madonna del Parto, attributed to Carlo Dolci. It reuses as spolia Roman columns from the 4th century.

The cathedral also has a 16th-century silver equestrian statue of Saint Ambrose by the jeweller Fantino Taglietti and two 16th-century silver busts of Saints Peter and Paul attributed to followers of Benvenuto Cellini.
