= Marco Antonio Salomone =

Most Reverend Marco Antonio Salomone
- Bishop of Sora
- Church: Catholic Church
- Diocese: Diocese of Sora
- In office: 1591–1608
- Predecessor: Orazio Ciceroni
- Successor: Giulio Calvo d'Albeto

Personal details
- Died: 12 October 1615

Marco Antonio Salomone (died 1615) was a Roman Catholic prelate who served as Bishop of Sora (1591–1608).

== Biography ==
On 31 July 1591, Marco Antonio Salomone was appointed during the papacy of Pope Gregory XIV as Bishop of Sora. He served as Bishop of Sora until his resignation in 1608. He died on 12 October 1615. While bishop, he was the principal co-consecrator of Jullio del Carretto, Bishop of Casale Monferrato (1594), Giulio Calvo d'Albeto, Bishop of Sora (1608), and Rodolfo Paleotti, Bishop of Imola (1611).

== External links and additional sources ==
- Cheney, David M. "Diocese of Sora-Cassino-Aquino-Portecorvino". Catholic-Hierarchy.org. (for Chronology of Bishops) ^{[self-published]}
- Chow, Gabriel. "Diocese of Sora-Cassino-Aquino-Portecorvino (Italy)". GCatholic.org. (for Chronology of Bishops) ^{[self-published]}

Catholic Church titles
Preceded by Orazio Ciceroni	Bishop of Sora; 1591–1608	Succeeded by Giulio Calvo d'Albeto
