= Giulio Doffi =

Italian Roman Catholic prelate

Most Reverend Giulio Doffi
- Bishop of Alessano
- Church: Catholic Church
- Diocese: Diocese of Alessano
- In office: 1595–1596
- Predecessor: Orazio Rapari
- Successor: Celso Mancini

Orders
- Consecration: 2 April 1595 by Giulio Antonio Santorio

Personal details
- Born: 1534
- Died: 27 August 1596 (age 62) Alessano, Kingdom of Naples

Giulio Doffi, O.P., also Giulio Doffius, (1534 – 27 August 1596) was a Roman Catholic prelate who served as Bishop of Alessano from 1595 to 1596.

== Biography ==
Giulio Doffi was born in 1534 and ordained a priest in the Order of Preachers. On 6 March 1595, he was appointed during the papacy of Pope Clement VIII as Bishop of Alessano. On 2 April 1595, he was consecrated bishop by Giulio Antonio Santorio, Cardinal-Priest of Santa Maria in Trastevere, with Flaminio Filonardi, Bishop of Aquino, and Leonard Abel, Titular Bishop of Sidon, serving as co-consecrators. He served as Bishop of Alessano until his death on 27 August 1596. While bishop, he was the principal co-consecrator of Vincent Correrio Cammerota, Coadjutor Bishop of Muro Lucano (1595).

== External links and additional sources ==
- Cheney, David M. "Diocese of Alessano". Catholic-Hierarchy.org. (for Chronology of Bishops) ^{[self-published]}
- Chow, Gabriel. "Titular Episcopal See of Alessano (Italy)". GCatholic.org. (for Chronology of Bishops) ^{[self-published]}

Catholic Church titles
Preceded by Orazio Rapari	Bishop of Alessano; 1592–1594	Succeeded by Celso Mancini
