= Giacomo Galletti =

Italian Roman Catholic prelate

Most Reverend Giacomo Galletti
- Bishop of Alessano
- Church: Catholic Church
- Diocese: Diocese of Alessano
- In office: 1560–1574
- Predecessor: Giulio Galletti
- Successor: Cesare Busdragus

Personal details
- Died: September 1574 Alessano, Italy

Giacomo Galletti (died 1574) was a Roman Catholic prelate who served as Bishop of Alessano (1560–1574).

== Biography ==
On 2 October 1560, Giacomo Galletti was appointed during the papacy of Pope Pius IV as Bishop of Alessano. He served as Bishop of Alessano until his death in September 1574.

== Episcopal succession ==
While bishop, he was the principal co-consecrator of:

- Girolamo Gaddi, Bishop of Cortona (1563);
- Maurice MacGibbon, Archbishop of Cashel (1567);
- Alexandre de Bardi, Bishop of Saint-Papoul (1567); and
- Pietro Giacomo Malombra, Bishop of Cariati e Cerenzia (1568).

== External links and additional sources ==
- Cheney, David M. "Diocese of Alessano". Catholic-Hierarchy.org. (for Chronology of Bishops) ^{[self-published]}
- Chow, Gabriel. "Titular Episcopal See of Alessano (Italy)". GCatholic.org. (for Chronology of Bishops) ^{[self-published]}

Catholic Church titles
Preceded by Giulio Galletti	Bishop of Alessano; 1560–1574	Succeeded by Cesare Busdragus
