= Annibale Magalotti =

Italian Roman Catholic prelate

Most Reverend Annibale Magalotti
- Bishop of Alessano
- Church: Catholic Church
- Diocese: Diocese of Alessano
- In office: 1549–1551
- Predecessor: Evangelista Cittadini
- Successor: Leonardo de Magistris

Personal details
- Died: 1551 Alessano, Italy

Annibale Magalotti (died 1551) was a Roman Catholic prelate who served as Bishop of Alessano (1549–1551).

== Biography ==
On 18 January 1549, Annibale Magalotti was appointed during the papacy of Pope Paul III as Bishop of Alessano. He served as Bishop of Alessano until his death in 1551.

== External links and additional sources ==
- Cheney, David M. "Diocese of Alessano". Catholic-Hierarchy.org. (for Chronology of Bishops) ^{[self-published]}
- Chow, Gabriel. "Titular Episcopal See of Alessano (Italy)". GCatholic.org. (for Chronology of Bishops) ^{[self-published]}

Catholic Church titles
Preceded by Evangelista Cittadini	Bishop of Alessano; 1549–1551	Succeeded by Leonardo de Magistris
