= Nicola Antonio Spinelli =

Roman Catholic prelate

Most Reverend Nicola Antonio Spinelli
- Bishop of Alessano
- Church: Catholic Church
- Diocese: Diocese of Alessano
- In office: 1612–1634
- Predecessor: Celso Mancini
- Successor: Placido Padiglia

Orders
- Consecration: 1 August 1612 by Bonifazio Caetani

Personal details
- Born: 1583 Naples, Italy
- Died: 23 September 1634 (Age: 50–51) Alessano, Italy

Nicola Antonio Spinelli, C.R. (1583 – 23 September 1634) was a Roman Catholic prelate who served as Bishop of Alessano (1612–1634).

== Biography ==
Nicola Antonio Spinelli was born in 1583 in Naples, Italy and ordained a priest in the Congregation of Clerics Regular of the Divine Providence. On 16 July 1612, he was appointed during the papacy of Pope Paul V as Bishop of Alessano. On 1 August 1612, he was consecrated bishop by Bonifazio Caetani, Bishop of Cassano all'Jonio, with Giovanni Battista del Tufo, Bishop Emeritus of Acerra, and Domingo de Oña, Bishop of Gaeta, serving as co-consecrators. He served as Bishop of Alessano until his death on 23 September 1634.

== External links and additional sources ==
- Cheney, David M. "Diocese of Alessano". Catholic-Hierarchy.org. (for Chronology of Bishops) ^{[self-published]}
- Chow, Gabriel. "Titular Episcopal See of Alessano (Italy)". GCatholic.org. (for Chronology of Bishops) ^{[self-published]}

Catholic Church titles
Preceded by Celso Mancini	Bishop of Alessano; 1612–1634	Succeeded by Placido Padiglia
