= Roman Catholic Diocese of Alessano =

The Roman Catholic Diocese of Alessano (Latin: Dioecesis Alexanensis) was a Roman Catholic diocese in Italy, located in the city of Alessano, in the province of Lecce, part of Apulia region of south-east Italy. On 28 June 1818, it was suppressed to the Diocese of Ugento.

== Ecclesiastical history ==
Although an episcopal see of Alessano (Latin: Alexanum) may date from around 700 AD or was probably established under Norman rule around 900 AD, but the regular succession of its bishops began only in 1283 with a Giovanni from Naples. Until the 16th century, papal bulls regarding the bishopric called it either Alexanum or Leuca. It was a suffragan of the Metropolitan of Otranto.

On 17 May 1518, it was suppressed, its territory being merged into the diocese of Lecce under Bishop Giovanni Antonio Acquaviva d'Aragona, but it was restored on 3 June 1521.

Byzantine liturgical usages continued to be observed until abolished by Bishop Ercole Lamia (1578–1591).

The existence of the residential see was ended by the papal bull De utiliori of 27 June 1818 of Pope Pius VII, which assigned its territory to the then diocese of Ugento.

== Ordinaries ==
=== Diocese of Alessano ===
700: Established as Diocese of Alessano

- Berengario (? – 1402.02.27), later Bishop of Castro (1402.02.27 – 1429)
- Paolo (1402.01.07 – death 1405)
- Giovanni Sanfelice (12 Oct 1405- 24 Sep 1423 Appointed, Bishop of Muro Lucano)
- Domenico di Napoli (1425? – ?)
- Giacomo del Balzo (1431? – ?)
- Simone da Brindisi, Friars Minor (O.F.M.) (1432.04.11 – death 1432); previously Bishop of Ruvo (Italy) (1418.01.26 – 1432.04.11)
- Guiduccio Guidano (1432.09.16 – 1438.08.06), later Bishop of Lecce (Italy) (1438.08.06 – 1453.07.13), Metropolitan Archbishop of Bari–Canosa (Italy) (1453.07.13 – 1454)
- Lorenzo, Dominican Order (O.P.) (1438 – ?)
- Benedetto del Balzo (1465–1488)
- Giovanni Giacomo del Balzo (1488 – death 1512)
- Giovanni Antonio Acquaviva d'Aragona (1512.03.03 – 1517.05.18), later Bishop of Lecce (Italy) (1517.05.18 – 1525)
- Luigi d'Aragona (1517.05.18 – 1518.05.17)

17 May 1518: Suppressed and merged into the Diocese of Lecce

3 June 1521: Reestablished again as Diocese of Alessano

- Agostino Trivulzio, Apostolic Administrator (1521.06.03 – 1526.07.20)
- Alessandro Cesarini, Apostolic Administrator (1526.07.20 – 1531.11.15), while Cardinal-Deacon of S. Maria in Via Lata (1523.12.14 – 1540.05.31), Protodeacon of Sacred College of Cardinals (1523.12.14 – 1540.05.31), Apostolic Administrator of Otranto (Italy) (1526.04.09 – 1536.03.22)
- Francesco Antonio Balduini (1531.11.15 – death 1539)
- Benedetto de Sanctis (1540 – death 1542)
- Evangelista Cittadini (1542–1549)
- Annibale Magalotti (1549 – death 1551)
- Leonardo de Magistris (1551.08.21 – death 1554); previously Bishop of Capri (1540.02.13 – 1551.08.21)
- Giulio Galletti (1555–1560)
- Giacomo Galletti (1560–1574)
- Cesare Busdragus (1574 – 1578.08.11), later Metropolitan Archbishop of Chieti (Italy) (1578.08.11 – death 1585.10)
- Ercole Lamia (1578 – death 1591)
- Settimio Borsari (1591 – 1592.06.12), later Bishop of Casale Monferrato (Italy) (1592.06.12 – 1594.04.29)
- Sestilio Mazuca (Sextilius Mazuca)(1592.06.19 – 1594)
- Orazio Rapari (Horatius Raparius) (1594 – death 1595)
- Giulio Doffi (Giulio Doffius), O.P. (1595 – death 1597)
- Celso Mancini (1597 – death 1612)
- Nicola Antonio Spinelli, C.R. (1612 – death 1634)
- Placido Padiglia, Celestines (O.S.B. Cel.) (1634.11.27 – death 1648); previously Bishop of Lavello (1627.09.20 – 1634.11.27)
- Francesco Antonio Roberti (1648 – death 1653)
- Giovanni Granafei (1653 – 1666.11.10), later Metropolitan Archbishop of Bari–Canosa (Italy) (1666.11.10 – 1683.03.18)
- Andrea Tontoli (1666 – 1695.02.07), later Bishop of Vieste (Italy) (1695.02.07 – death 1696.10.21)
- Vincenzo della Marra (1695 – death 1712)
- Giovanni Belardino Giannelli (1717.12.18 – death 1743)
- Archbishop-Bishop Luigi d'Alessandro (1743.07.15 – 1754.09.16), previously Metropolitan Archbishop of Santa Severina (Italy) (1731.05.07 – 1743.07.15); later Metropolitan Archbishop of Bari–Canosa (Italy) (1754.09.16 – death 1770)
- Dionigi Latomo (1754.12.16 – 1781)
- Gaetano Paolo de Miceli, Ardorini Missionaries (P.O.C.R.) (1792.02.27 – 1804.10.29); later Archbishop of Rossano (Italy) (1804.10.29 – 1813.10.22)

1818 June 27: Suppressed to the Diocese of Ugento

1968: Restored as Titular Episcopal See of Alessano

== Titular see ==
The bishopric of Alexanum is today listed by the Catholic Church as a titular see, having been nominally restored in 1968 as a titular bishopric.

It has had the following incumbents, of the lowest (episcopal) class, except the first and the latest (who were granted the Personal Title and rank of Archbishop) :

- Titular Archbishop Tomás Alberto Clavel Méndez (1968.12.18 – 1978.02.21), as emeritate; previously Bishop of David (Panama) (1955.07.24 – 1964.03.03), President of Episcopal Conference of Panama (1964–1967), President of Episcopal Secretariat of Central America and Panama (1964–1971), Metropolitan Archbishop of Panamá (Panama) (1964.03.03 – 1968.12.18)
- Titular Bishop William Russell Houck (1979.03.28 – 1984.04.11)
- Titular Bishop Hernán Giraldo Jaramillo (1984.06.27 – 1987.07.07)
- Titular Bishop Natalino Pescarolo (1990.04.07 – 1992.05.04)
- Titular Bishop Bosco Lin Chi-nan (林吉男) (1992.09.28 – 2004.01.24)
- Titular Archbishop Michael A. Blume, Divine Word Missionaries (S.V.D.) (2005.08.24 – ...), Apostolic Nuncio (papal ambassador) to Uganda

== Bibliography ==
- Ferdinando Ughelli; Niccolò Coleti (1721). Italia sacra sive De episcopis Italiæ, et insularum adjacentium... (in Latin). Vol. Tomus nonus (IX). Venice: apud Sebastianum Coleti. pp. 86–93.
- Giuseppe Cappelletti (1870). Le chiese d'Italia dalla loro origine sino ai nostri giorni (in Italian). Vol. XXI. Venezia: G. Antonelli. pp. 322–326.
- Pius Bonifatius Gams (1873). Series episcoporum Ecclesiae catholicae: quotquot innotuerunt a beato Petro apostolo (in Latin). Ratisbon: Typis et Sumptibus Georgii Josephi Manz.
- Konrad Eubel (1898). Hierarchia catholica medii aevi: sive Summorum pontificum, S.R.E. cardinalium, ecclesiarum antistitum series ab anno 1198 usque ad annum [1605] perducta e documentis tabularii praesertim Vaticani collecta, digesta (in Latin). Vol. I. Munster: sumptibus et typis librariae Regensbergianae.
- Konrad Eubel (1901). Hierarchia catholica medii aevi: 1434–1503 (in Latin). Munster: Monasterii, sumptibus et typis librariae Regensbergianae.
- Gulik, Guilelmus van; Konrad Eubel (1923). L. Schmitz-Kallenberg (ed.). Hierarchia catholica medii aevi (in Latin). Vol. III (editio altera ed.). Münster: sumptibus et typis librariae Regensbergianae.
- Patrick Gauchat (1960). Hierarchia catholica medii aevi, sive summorum pontificum, S.R.E. cardinalium ecclesiarum antistitum series: A pontificatu Clementis PP. VIII (1592) usque ad pontificatum Alexandri PP. VII (1667) (in Latin). Regensberg.
