= Vincenzo Busdraghi =

Italian printer (fl. 1549–1601)

Vincenzo Busdraghi (19 December 1524 – 27 August 1601), also known as Vincenzo Busdrago, was an Italian printer and publisher active in Lucca during the Renaissance. He established a printing workshop in 1549 and played a significant role in developing a continuous printing industry in the Republic of Lucca. His publications included literary, religious, philosophical, legal and educational works.

== Biography ==
The fountain bearing the Busdraghi coat of arms, originally from the villa in Vorno and attributed to Bartolomeo Ammannati.

=== Early life and establishment of the press ===
Busdraghi was born in Lucca on 19 December 1524, the son of Niccolò di Giovanni Battista Busdraghi and Camilla Parpaglioni. He belonged to the Busdraghi family, a prominent Lucchese family historically involved in commerce, banking and public administration. In 1549 he sought financial assistance from the government of Lucca to establish a printing business, particularly for the production of schoolbooks. On 16 July 1549, the city's Council of Thirty-Six approved an annual subsidy of five scudi for five years, subject to official examination and authorization of the publications. Although his workshop initially operated with limited resources, Busdraghi helped establish a lasting printing industry in a city where previous printing activity had been intermittent.

=== Printing and publishing activity ===
His earliest known publication, dated 1 June 1549, was Quattro novelle dell'honoratissimo Molza, a collection of four stories attributed to Francesco Maria Molza. A copy, once belonging to the collection of Giacomo Manzoni, was subsequently acquired by the government library of Lucca. Among his early publications were Aridosio, a comedy by Lorenzino de' Medici, and the tragedy Canace by Sperone Speroni, published in 1550. During the following decades, his workshop printed works by several prominent Renaissance authors, including Matteo Bandello, Aonio Paleario, Chiara Matraini, Laura Terracina and Flaminio de' Nobili.

=== Matteo Bandello and Renaissance literature ===
One of the best-known publications issued by Busdraghi was the 1554 edition of the first three parts of the Novelle by Matteo Bandello. Bandello's stories circulated widely in Renaissance Europe and contributed to the literary tradition from which later European dramatists drew inspiration. Among them was a version of the story of Romeo and Juliet, subsequently adapted through French and English literary intermediaries. Busdraghi's edition is therefore of particular interest to scholars studying the transmission of Italian Renaissance narrative literature.

=== Other notable publications ===
Title page of Paolo Interiano's Inventione del corso della longitudine (1551), printed in Lucca by Vincenzo Busdraghi.

Busdraghi's press produced works covering a wide range of subjects, including humanist scholarship, religious writing, poetry, philosophy, civic administration and law. Among the publications recorded in historical bibliographies were:

- Francesco Maria Molza, Quattro novelle dell'honoratissimo Molza (1549);
- Lorenzino de' Medici, Aridosio (1549);
- Sperone Speroni, Canace (1550);
- Aonio Paleario, Orationes ad Senatum Populumque Lucensem (1551);
- Paolo Interiano, Ristretto delle historie genovesi (1551), a historical account of Genoa.
- Paolo Interiano, Inventione del corso della longitudine (1551), a work concerning longitude and the celestial sphere.
- Girolamo Borro, Dialogo del flusso et reflusso del mare, together with Ragionamento della perfettione delle donne (1561), discussing the causes of tides and philosophical questions concerning women.
- Chiara Matraini, Rime e prose (1553) and Altre rime (1554);
- Matteo Bandello, Novelle (1554);
- Laura Terracina, Le seste rime (1558);
- Flaminio de' Nobili, Trattato dell'amore umano (1563);
- Statuta Carrariae (1574);
- Chiara Matraini, Meditazioni spirituali (1581) and Lettere e rime (1595).

Busdraghi also printed works commissioned by the authorities of Lucca and publications connected with the religious and intellectual life of the city.

=== Printing devices and typography ===
The printing house used devices featuring a dragon, derived from the heraldic emblem of the Busdraghi family. Different versions of the device appeared in its publications, reflecting the visual identity of the workshop. Over time, the printing house experienced financial and technical difficulties. According to the bibliographer Alfredo Cioni, the quality of some later editions declined as printing materials became worn and were not systematically replaced.

=== Later years and legacy ===
During the final years of Busdraghi's career, the management of the printing business became associated with his collaborator Ottaviano Guidoboni, who continued its activity after Busdraghi's death. Busdraghi died in Lucca on 27 August 1601. In 1972, Alfredo Cioni recorded 163 editions attributable to Busdraghi's printing activity, while noting that additional unidentified editions might exist. Subsequent bibliographical research has continued to examine the production and history of his press. Copies of Busdraghi's publications are preserved in historical library collections and are studied as part of the history of Italian Renaissance printing.

== Family ==
Detail of the dragon from the fountain bearing the Busdraghi coat of arms, originally from the villa in Vorno and attributed to Bartolomeo Ammannati.

Vincenzo Busdraghi belonged to the Lucchese Busdraghi family. His father, Niccolò, was the brother of Gherardo Busdraghi, a Catholic bishop and ecclesiastical official who worked with the papal nuncio Giovanni Della Casa in Venice. Gherardo was therefore Vincenzo's paternal uncle. Another member of the family, Cesare Busdrago, became Archbishop of Chieti in 1578.

== Bibliography ==
- Cioni, Alfredo (1972). "Busdraghi, Vincenzo". Dizionario Biografico degli Italiani, vol. 15. Rome: Istituto dell'Enciclopedia Italiana.
- Luzzati, Michele (1972). "Busdraghi". Dizionario Biografico degli Italiani, vol. 15. Rome: Istituto dell'Enciclopedia Italiana.
- Matteucci, L. (1917–1918). "Saggio d'un catalogo delle edizioni lucchesi di Vincenzo Busdraghi (1549–1605)". La Bibliofilia, vols. 18–19.
- Pellegrini, F. (1918). "Appendice di un catalogo delle edizioni lucchesi di Vincenzo Busdraghi". La Bibliofilia, vol. 19.
- Longoni, Franco (2003). "Le prime edizioni di Vincenzo Busdraghi". Libri & Documenti, vol. 29, nos. 1–3, pp. 1–12.
- Martini, Davide; Rossi, Tommaso Maria; Unfer Verre, Gaia Elisabetta, eds. (2017). Vincenzo Busdraghi (1524–1601). Uno stampatore europeo a Lucca. Viareggio.

== See also ==
- History of printing
- Printing in Italy
- Republic of Lucca
- Matteo Bandello
- Renaissance literature
