= Jullio del Carretto =

Roman Catholic bishop (d. 1614)

Most Reverend Jullio del Carretto
- Church: Catholic Church
- Diocese: Diocese of Casale Monferrato
- In office: 1594–1614
- Predecessor: Settimio Borsari
- Successor: Scipione Pasquali

Orders
- Consecration: 25 July 1594 by Girolamo Bernerio

Personal details
- Died: 13 October 1614 Casale Monferrato, Italy

Jullio del Carretto (died 13 October 1614) was a Roman Catholic prelate who served as Bishop of Casale Monferrato (1594–1614). According to Giuseppe Cappelletti, his first name (as his tombstone indicates) was Tullio, not Jullio.

== Biography ==
On 13 July 1594, Jullio del Carretto was appointed Bishop of Casale Monferrato by Pope Clement VIII. On 25 July 1594, he was consecrated bishop by Girolamo Bernerio, Bishop of Ascoli Piceno, with Guillaume de St-Marcel d'Avançon, Archbishop of Embrun, and Marco Antonio Salomone, Bishop of Sora, serving as co-consecrators. He served as Bishop of Casale Monferrato until his death on 13 October 1614. While bishop, he was the principal co-consecrator of Girolamo Palazzuoli, Bishop of Isola (1610); Giambattista Brivio, Bishop of Cremona (1610); and Pietro Bastoni, Bishop of Umbriatico (1611).

== See also ==
- Catholic Church in Italy

== Sources ==
- Bosio, Antonio (1863). Cenni biografici sopra il venerabile servo di Dio Tullio del Carretto di Millesimo, vescovo di Casale (in Italian). (Savona: tip. Vescovile di Miralta 1863).
- Constitutiones Tullii Carretti, episcopi Casalen. In prima dioecesana Synodo promulgatae anno Domini 1597, iiij septembris. (Casale: Bernardus Grassi 1597).

Catholic Church titles
Preceded by Settimio Borsari	Bishop of Casale Monferrato; 1594–1614	Succeeded by Scipione Pasquali
