= Sestilio Mazuca =

Italian Roman Catholic prelate

Most Reverend Sestilio Mazuca
- Bishop of Alessano
- Church: Catholic Church
- Diocese: Diocese of Alessano
- In office: 1592–1594
- Predecessor: Settimio Borsari
- Successor: Orazio Rapari

Sestilio Mazuca or Sextilius Mazuca or Sestilio Massuca or Sextilius Massuca was a Roman Catholic prelate who served as Bishop of Alessano (1592–1594).

== Biography ==
On 19 June 1592, Sestilio Mazuca was appointed during the papacy of Pope Clement VIII as Bishop of Alessano. He served as Bishop of Alessano until his resignation in 1594.

== External links and additional sources ==
- Cheney, David M. "Diocese of Alessano". Catholic-Hierarchy.org. (for Chronology of Bishops) ^{[self-published]}
- Chow, Gabriel. "Titular Episcopal See of Alessano (Italy)". GCatholic.org. (for Chronology of Bishops) ^{[self-published]}

Catholic Church titles
| Preceded by Settimio Borsari | Bishop of Alessano; 1592–1594 | Succeeded by Orazio Rapari |
