= Angelo Baretta =

Most Reverend Angelo Baretta
- Bishop of Capri
- Church: Catholic Church
- Diocese: Diocese of Capri
- In office: 1534–1539
- Predecessor: Agostino Falivenia
- Successor: Leonardo de Magistris

Personal details
- Died: 1539 Capri, Italy

Angelo Baretta (died 1539) was a Roman Catholic prelate who served as Bishop of Capri (1534–1539).

On 24 April 1534, Eusebio de Granito was appointed during the papacy of Pope Clement VII as Bishop of Capri. He served as Bishop of Capri until his death in 1539.

== External links and additional sources ==
- Cheney, David M. "Diocese of Capri". Catholic-Hierarchy.org. (for Chronology of Bishops) ^{[self-published]}
- Chow, Gabriel. "Titular Episcopal See of Capri (Italy)". GCatholic.org. (for Chronology of Bishops) ^{[self-published]}

Catholic Church titles
Preceded by Agostino Falivenia	Bishop of Capri; 1534–1539	Succeeded by Leonardo de Magistris
