= Benedetto del Balzo =

Italian Roman Catholic prelate

Most Reverend Benedetto del Balzo
- Bishop of Alessano
- Church: Catholic Church
- Diocese: Diocese of Alessano
- In office: 1465–1488
- Successor: Giovanni Giacomo del Balzo

Benedetto del Balzo was a Roman Catholic prelate who served as Bishop of Alessano (1465–1488).

== Biography ==
In 1465, Giovanni Giacomo del Balzo was appointed during the papacy of Pope Paul II as Bishop of Alessano. He served as Bishop of Alessano until his resignation in 1488.

== External links and additional sources ==
- Cheney, David M. "Diocese of Alessano". Catholic-Hierarchy.org. (for Chronology of Bishops) ^{[self-published]}
- Chow, Gabriel. "Titular Episcopal See of Alessano (Italy)". GCatholic.org. (for Chronology of Bishops) ^{[self-published]}

Catholic Church titles
Preceded by	Bishop of Alessano; 1465–1488	Succeeded by Giovanni Giacomo del Balzo
