= Scipione Pasquali =

Roman Catholic prelate

Most Reverend Scipione Pasquali
- Bishop of Casale Monferrato
- Church: Catholic Church
- Diocese: Diocese of Casale Monferrato
- In office: 1615–1624
- Predecessor: Jullio del Carretto
- Successor: Scipione Agnelli

Orders
- Consecration: 1 February 1615 by Giovanni Garzia Mellini

Personal details
- Died: 1624 Casale Monferrato, Italy

Scipione Pasquali (died 1624) was a Roman Catholic prelate who served as Bishop of Casale Monferrato (1615–1624).

== Biography ==
On 12 January 1615, Scipione Pasquali was appointed during the papacy of Pope Paul V as Bishop of Casale Monferrato. On 1 February 1615, he was consecrated bishop by Giovanni Garzia Mellini, Cardinal-Priest of Santi Quattro Coronati with Ulpiano Volpi, Archbishop of Chieti, and Marco Cornaro (bishop), Bishop of Padua, serving as co-consecrators. He served as Bishop of Casale Monferrato until his death in 1624.

== External links and additional sources ==
- Cheney, David M. "Diocese of Casale Monferrato". Catholic-Hierarchy.org. (for Chronology of Bishops) ^{[self-published]}
- Chow, Gabriel. "Diocese of Casale Monferrato (Italy)". GCatholic.org. (for Chronology of Bishops) ^{[self-published]}

Catholic Church titles
Preceded by Jullio del Carretto	Bishop of Casale Monferrato; 1615–1624	Succeeded by Scipione Agnelli
