= Giulio Galletti =

Italian Roman Catholic prelate

Most Reverend Giulio Galletti
- Bishop of Alessano
- Church: Catholic Church
- Diocese: Diocese of Alessano
- In office: 1555–1560
- Predecessor: Leonardo de Magistris
- Successor: Giacomo Galletti

Giulio Galletti was a Roman Catholic prelate who served as Bishop of Alessano (1555–1560).

== Biography ==
On 7 January 1555, Giulio Galletti was appointed during the papacy of Pope Julius III as Bishop of Alessano. He served as Bishop of Alessano until his resignation in 1560. While bishop, he was the principal co-consecrator of Flavio Orsini, Bishop of Muro Lucano (1561), and Annibale Saraceni, Bishop of Lecce (1561).

== External links and additional sources ==
- Cheney, David M. "Diocese of Alessano". Catholic-Hierarchy.org. (for Chronology of Bishops) ^{[self-published]}
- Chow, Gabriel. "Titular Episcopal See of Alessano (Italy)". GCatholic.org. (for Chronology of Bishops) ^{[self-published]}

Catholic Church titles
Preceded by Leonardo de Magistris	Bishop of Alessano; 1555–1560	Succeeded by Giacomo Galletti
