= Giovanni Antonio Acquaviva d'Aragona =

Bishop of Lecce from 1517 to 1525

Most Reverend Giovanni Antonio Acquaviva d'Aragona
- Bishop of Lecce
- Church: Catholic Church
- Diocese: Diocese of Lecce
- In office: 1517–1525
- Predecessor: Ugolino Martelli (bishop)
- Successor: Consalvo di Sangro
- Previous post: Bishop of Alessano (1512–1517)

Personal details
- Died: 1525 Lecce, Italy

Giovanni Antonio Acquaviva d'Aragona (died 1525) was a Roman Catholic prelate who served as Bishop of Lecce (1517–1525) and Bishop of Alessano (1512–1517).

== Biography ==
On 3 March 1512, Giovanni Antonio Acquaviva d'Aragona was appointed by Pope Julius II as Bishop of Alessano. On 18 May 1517, he was appointed by Pope Leo X as Bishop of Lecce. He served as Bishop of Lecce until his death in 1525.

== See also ==
- Catholic Church in Italy

== External links and additional sources ==
- Cheney, David M. "Diocese of Alessano". Catholic-Hierarchy.org. (for Chronology of Bishops) ^{[self-published]}
- Chow, Gabriel. "Titular Episcopal See of Alessano (Italy)". GCatholic.org. (for Chronology of Bishops) ^{[self-published]}
- Cheney, David M. "Archdiocese of Lecce". Catholic-Hierarchy.org. (for Chronology of Bishops) ^{[self-published]}
- Chow, Gabriel. "Metropolitan Archdiocese of Lecce(Italy)". GCatholic.org. (for Chronology of Bishops) ^{[self-published]}

Catholic Church titles
Preceded by Giovanni Giacomo del Balzo	Bishop of Alessano; 1512–1517	Succeeded by Luigi d'Aragona
Preceded by Ugolino Martelli (bishop)	Bishop of Lecce; 1517–1525	Succeeded by Consalvo di Sangro
