= Settimio Borsari =

Italian Roman Catholic prelate

Most Reverend Settimio Borsari
- Church: Catholic Church
- Diocese: Diocese of Casale Monferrato
- Predecessor: Marcantonio Gonzaga
- Successor: Jullio del Carretto
- Previous post: Bishop of Alessano (1591–1592)

Orders
- Consecration: 30 November 1591 by Girolamo Bernerio

Personal details
- Died: 29 April 1594 Casale Monferrato, Italy

Settimio Borsari (died 29 April 1594) was a Roman Catholic prelate who served as Bishop of Casale Monferrato (1592–1594) and Bishop of Alessano (1591–1592).

== Biography ==
On 20 November 1591, Settimio Borsari was appointed Bishop of Alessano by Pope Innocent IX. On 30 November 1591, he was consecrated bishop by Girolamo Bernerio, Bishop of Ascoli Piceno, with Galeazzo Moroni, Bishop of Macerata e Tolentino, and Ottavio Abbiosi, Bishop of Pistoia, serving as co-consecrators.

On 12 June 1592, he was appointed Bishop of Casale Monferrato by Pope Clement VIII. He served as Bishop of Casale Monferrato until his death on 29 April 1594.

== See also ==
- Catholic Church in Italy

== External links and additional sources ==
- Cheney, David M. "Diocese of Alessano". Catholic-Hierarchy.org. (for Chronology of Bishops) ^{[self-published]}
- Chow, Gabriel. "Titular Episcopal See of Alessano (Italy)". GCatholic.org. (for Chronology of Bishops) ^{[self-published]}
- Cheney, David M. "Diocese of Casale Monferrato". Catholic-Hierarchy.org. (for Chronology of Bishops) ^{[self-published]}
- Chow, Gabriel. "Diocese of Casale Monferrato (Italy)". GCatholic.org. (for Chronology of Bishops) ^{[self-published]}

Catholic Church titles
Preceded by Ercole Lamia	Bishop of Alessano; 1591–1592	Succeeded by Sextilius Mazuca
Preceded by Marcantonio Gonzaga	Bishop of Casale Monferrato; 1592–1594	Succeeded by Jullio del Carretto
