= Evangelista Cittadini =

Italian Roman Catholic prelate

Most Reverend Evangelista Cittadini
- Bishop of Alessano
- Church: Catholic Church
- Diocese: Diocese of Alessano
- In office: 1542–1549
- Predecessor: Benedetto de Sanctis
- Successor: Annibale Magalotti

Orders
- Consecration: 28 December 1544 by Taddeo Pepoli

Evangelista Cittadini was a Roman Catholic prelate who served as Bishop of Alessano (1542–1549).

== Biography ==
On 26 April 1542, Evangelista Cittadini was appointed during the papacy of Pope Paul III as Bishop of Alessano. On 28 December 1544, he was consecrated bishop by Taddeo Pepoli, Bishop of Carinola, with Antonio Numai, Bishop of Isernia, and Ludovico Simonetta, Bishop of Pesaro, serving as co-consecrators. He served as Bishop of Alessano until his resignation in 1549.

== External links and additional sources ==
- Cheney, David M. "Diocese of Alessano". Catholic-Hierarchy.org. (for Chronology of Bishops) ^{[self-published]}
- Chow, Gabriel. "Titular Episcopal See of Alessano (Italy)". GCatholic.org. (for Chronology of Bishops) ^{[self-published]}

Catholic Church titles
Preceded by Benedetto de Sanctis	Bishop of Alessano; 1542–1549	Succeeded by Annibale Magalotti
