= Ercole Lamia =

Most Reverend Ercole Lamia
- Bishop of Alessano
- Church: Catholic Church
- Diocese: Diocese of Alessano
- In office: 1578–1591
- Predecessor: Cesare Busdragus
- Successor: Settimio Borsari

Ercole Lamia (died 1591) was a Roman Catholic prelate who served as Bishop of Alessano (1578–1591).

== Biography ==
On 11 August 1578, Ercole Lamia was appointed during the papacy of Pope Gregory XIII as Bishop of Alessano. He served as Bishop of Alessano until his resignation in 1591.

== See also ==
- Catholic Church in Italy

== External links and additional sources ==
- Cheney, David M. "Diocese of Alessano". Catholic-Hierarchy.org. (for Chronology of Bishops) ^{[self-published]}
- Chow, Gabriel. "Titular Episcopal See of Alessano (Italy)". GCatholic.org. (for Chronology of Bishops) ^{[self-published]}

Catholic Church titles
| Preceded by Cesare Busdragus | Bishop of Alessano; 1578–1591 | Succeeded by Settimio Borsari |
