= Cesare Busdragus =

Most Reverend Caesar Busdragus
- Archbishop of Chieti
- Church: Catholic Church
- Archdiocese: Archdiocese of Chieti
- In office: 1578–1585
- Predecessor: Jerome de Leonibus
- Successor: Giovanni Battista Castrucci
- Previous post: Bishop of Alessano (1574–1578)

Personal details
- Died: October 1585 Chieti, Italy

Caesar Busdragus or Cesare Busdrago (died October 1585) was a Roman Catholic prelate who served as Archbishop of Chieti (1578–1585) and Bishop of Alessano (1574–1578).

== Biography ==
On 1 October 1574, Caesar Busdragus was appointed during the papacy of Pope Gregory XIII as Bishop of Alessano. On 11 August 1578, he was appointed during the papacy of Pope Gregory XIII as Archbishop of Chieti. He served as Archbishop of Chieti until his death in October 1585.

== External links and additional sources ==
- Cheney, David M. "Archdiocese of Chieti-Vasto". Catholic-Hierarchy.org. (for Chronology of Bishops) ^{[self-published]}
- Chow, Gabriel. "Archdiocese of Chieti-Vasto (Italy)". GCatholic.org. (for Chronology of Bishops) ^{[self-published]}
- Cheney, David M. "Diocese of Alessano". Catholic-Hierarchy.org. (for Chronology of Bishops) ^{[self-published]}
- Chow, Gabriel. "Titular Episcopal See of Alessano (Italy)". GCatholic.org. (for Chronology of Bishops) ^{[self-published]}

Catholic Church titles
| Preceded by Giacomo Galletti | Bishop of Alessano; 1574–1578 | Succeeded by Ercole Lamia |
| Preceded by Jerome de Leonibus | Archbishop of Chieti; 1578–1585 | Succeeded by Giovanni Battista Castrucci |
