= Diocese of Casale Monferrato =

Roman Catholic diocese in Italy

Coordinates: 45.1375°N 8.4523°E

Diocese of Casale Monferrato Dioecesis Casalensis

Catholic
- Casale Monferrato Cathedral

Location
- Country: Italy
- Ecclesiastical province: Vercelli

Statistics
- Area: 970 km^{2} (370 sq mi)
- Population: Total; Catholics: (as of 2023); 94,083 ▼; 89,120 (guess) ▼
- Parishes: 115

Information
- Denomination: Catholic Church
- Rite: Roman Rite
- Established: 18 April 1474
- Cathedral: Cattedrale di S. Evasio e S. Lorenzo
- Secular priests: 55 (diocesan) ▼7 (Religious Orders) ▼10 Permanent Deacons ▲

Current leadership
- Pope: Leo XIV
- Bishop: Gianni Sacchi

Map

Website
- Diocese of Casale Monferrato (in Italian)

The Diocese of Casale Monferrato (Latin: Dioecesis Casalensis) is a Latin diocese of the Catholic Church in northwest Italy, a suffragan of the Archdiocese of Vercelli which forms part of the ecclesiastical region of Piedmont. The diocese, which adheres to the Roman Rite, was established on 18 April 1474 for political reasons, to transform the Marquisate of Montferrat into an ecclesiastic territory.

== History ==
Casale Monferrato, the ancient Bodincomagus, is a city in the province of Alessandria, Piedmont (Italy), on the River Po, and has been a stronghold since the time of the Lombards. Liutprand, King of the Lombards enlarged it, and, in 936, the Emperor Otto II made it the chief town of a marquisate, giving it to the sons of Aleran, Duke of Saxony. Later it was inherited by Emperor Michael VIII, Palaeologus, who sent thither his son Theodore. In 1533, the dynasty of the Palaeologi became extinct, and The Emperor Charles V gave Casale to the House of Gonzaga. From 1681 to 1706 it was in the hands of the French, from whom, in 1713, it passed to the House of Savoy.

The parish church of S. Evasius in Casale, and its college of Canons Regular of S. Augustine, is known from a grant made to them on 15 August 988. The Chapter was headed by a Provost, and the church was subject to the bishops of Vercelli. The medieval church building was consecrated on 4 January 1107, by Pope Paschal II.

Casale was created a diocese by the papal bull "In Eminenti" of 18 April 1474, by Sixtus IV; previously it belonged to the Diocese of Asti. The pope had been urged to action by Marchese Guglielmo Paleologo of Monferrat. The diocese was a suffragan of the metropolitan archdiocese of Milan, and its bishops attended the provincial synods of Milan. On 1 August 1474, Sixtus IV issued another bull, "Super Gregem," defining the boundaries of the new diocese.

Its first bishop was Bernardino de Tebaldeschi, a Roman related to the Orsini, though he was too young to be consecrated a bishop at the time of his appointment. His successor was Gian Giorgio Paleologo (1517–1525), who also governed the marquisate for his nephew, a minor. Among its noteworthy bishops were: the Dominican Benedetto Erba (1570), most zealous for the Christian instruction of children and the introduction of the Tridentine reforms, in which he was associated with Archbishop Charles Borromeo of Milan; he was also the founder of the monti di pietà. Another was Tullio del Carretto (d. 1614), who imitated other contemporary bishops and founded an oratory for priests. Scipione Pasquali (1615–1624) was the author of a history of the campaign of Charles Emmanuel I, Duke of Savoy against Montferrat in 1613. When the plague was ravaging Casale (1630) during the struggle between the French and the Spanish, the bishop is said to have nursed the sick himself.

=== Napoleonic Piedmont ===
In 1796, and again in 1798, armies of the French Republic entered Italy, and conquered Savoy. On 10 September 1798, the French established the Piedmontese Republic. After a brief occupation by Austrian troops, the French, under the First Consul, Napoleon Bonaparte, reconquered the Piedmont, and established the Subalpine Republic, which lasted only from June to September 1802. Thereafter the territory was annexed to the French Republic, and divided into the départements of Doire, Marengo, Pô, Sesia, Stura, and Tanaro. Casale became the capital of Marengo, and French law became the law of the land.

One of the policies of the French government was the reduction in the number of dioceses both in metropolitan France and in its annexed territories. The French pointed out that there were sixteen dioceses and one metropolitan (Turin) in the Piedmont, of which five were without bishops at the time and three whose bishops had just resigned. They demanded that the sixteen be reduced to eight with one metropolitan. In the bull "Gravissimis Causis" of 1 June 1803, Pope Pius VII authorized the papal legate to First Consul Bonaparte, Cardinal Giovanni Battista Caprara, to suppress a number of dioceses in the ecclesiastical province of Piedmont, including Casale. Caprara carried out his instructions in a decree of 23 January 1805. The assets of Casale, human and material, were transferred to the diocese of Alessandria, as were those of the dioceses of Tortona and Bobbio.

On 17 March 1805, Napoleon established the Kingdom of Italy, and on 23 May he had himself crowned King of Italy by Cardinal Caprara in the cathedral of Milan. During the rest of the year, he continued to adjust the political arrangements of Piedmont and Lombardy. Having decided that Alessandria needed to be strengthened as a military stronghold and arsenal for his control of the area, he announced on 17 May 1805, his decision to transfer the seat of the bishop of Alessandria to Casale. On 7 July 1805, Cardinal Caprara obligingly carried out a new circumscription, restored the cathedral in Casale to its cathedral status, and moved the bishop to Casale. On 23 December 1805, Bishop Villaret was officially transferred to Casale, and the diocese of Alessandria was suppressed.

After the defeat, abdication, and exile of Napoleon, the Congress of Vienna agreed to the restoration of the Kingdom of Sardinia. King Victor Emmanuel I of Sardinia invited Pope Pius VII to restore the good order of the Church in his kingdom, which had been disrupted by the French occupation. On 17 July 1817, the pope issued the bull "Beati Petri", which began by establishing de novo the ten dioceses which had been suppressed under the French, and delimiting the extent of each in detail, including Casale. In the same document, the pope also released the diocese of Vercelli from being a suffragan of the metropolitan of Turin, and elevated the diocese to the rank of metropolitan archdiocese. The new metropolitan archdiocese had as suffragans the dioceses of Alessandria, Biella, and Casale.

=== Cathedral ===
Among the churches of Casale are the cathedral, a monument of Lombard architecture, and the church of Sant’Ilario (Hilary of Poitiers).

=== Synods ===
A diocesan synod was an irregularly held, but important, meeting of the bishop of a diocese and his clergy. Its purpose was (1) to proclaim generally the various decrees already issued by the bishop; (2) to discuss and ratify measures on which the bishop chose to consult with his clergy; (3) to publish statutes and decrees of the diocesan synod, of the provincial synod, and of the Holy See.

On 23 April 1571, Bishop Benedetto Erba (1570–1576) held a diocesan synod; he held a second synod on 19 October 1574, and a third on 25 June 1576. Bishop Ambrogio Aldegati presided over a diocesan synod on 28 April 1568. Bishop Tullio Carretti held a diocesan synod on 4 September 1597.

On 8 April 1622, Bishop Scipione Pasquali (12 Jan 1615 – 1624) presided over a diocesan synod and published its decrees and other materials. On 9 December 1658, Bishop Francesco Mirolio held a diocesan synod.

Bishop Ignazio della Chiesa de Rodi (1746–1758) held a diocesan synod in Casale on 5–7 September 1756. On 27–29 August 1844, Bishop Francesco Icheri de Malabilia presided over a diocesan synod in the cathedral. A diocesan synod was held in the cathedral by Bishop Pietro Maria Ferrè on 31 August, 1 September, and 2 September 1879.

== Bishops ==
=== 1474 to 1700 ===
- Bernardino de Tebaldeschi (21 May 1474 – 1517 Died)
- Gian Giorgio Paleologo (1517 – 12 Jan 1525 Resigned)
- Bernardino Castellari (13 Jan 1525 – 15 Nov 1529 Resigned)
- Ippolito de' Medici (15 Nov 1529 – 6 Mar 1531 Resigned) Administrator
- Bernardino Castellari (6 Mar 1531 – 27 Jun 1546 Died)
- Bernardino della Croce, B. (7 Jun 1546 – 1547) Bishop-elect
- Francesco Micheli (13 Jul 1548 – 1555 Resigned)
- Scipione d'Este (5 Jun 1555 – 12 Jul 1567 Died)
- Ambrogio Aldegati, O.P. (1567 – 1570)
- Benedetto Erba, O.P. (16 Jun 1570 – 28 Dec 1576 Died)
- Alessandro Andreasi (11 Mar 1577 – 1583)
- Lelio Zimbramonti (14 Nov 1583 – 1589 Died)
- Marcantonio Gonzaga (30 Aug 1589 – 7 May 1592 Died)
- Settimio Borsari (12 Jun 1592 – 29 Apr 1594 Died)
- Tullio del Carretto (13 Jul 1594 – 13 Oct 1614)
- Scipione Pasquali (12 Jan 1615 – 1624 Died)
- Scipione Agnelli (1624 – 1653)
- Gerolamo Francesco Miroglio (29 Nov 1655 – 14 Sep 1679 Died)
- Lelio Ardizzone (13 May 1680 – Nov 1699 Died)

=== 1700 to 1900 ===
- Pier Secondo Radicati de Cocconato (9 May 1701 – 1728)
- Pier Gerolamo Caravadossi, O.P. (10 May 1728 – 25 May 1746 Died)
- Ignazio della Chiesa de Rodi (28 Nov 1746 – 29 Jul 1758 Died)
- Giuseppe Luigi Avogadro, C.R.L. (19 Nov 1759 – 22 May 1792 Died)
- Teresio Maria Carlo Vittorio Ferrero della Marmora (27 Jun 1796 – 18 May 1803 Resigned)
- Jean-Chrysostome de Villaret (23 Dec 1805 – 3 Oct 1814 Retired)
- Francesco Alciati (1817 – 1828)
- Francesco Maria Icheri di Malabaila (5 Jul 1830 Confirmed – Jul 1846 Died)
- Luigi Giuseppe Nazari di Calabiana (12 Apr 1847 – 1867)
- Pietro Maria Ferré (27 Mar 1867 – 13 Apr 1886 Died)
- Filippo Chiesa (7 Jun 1886 – 3 Nov 1886 Died)
- Edoardo Pulciano (14 Mar 1887 – 11 Jul 1892 Appointed, Bishop of Novara)
- Paolo Maria Barone (11 Jul 1892 – 17 Mar 1903 Resigned)

=== since 1900 ===
- Ludovico Gavotti (22 Jun 1903 – 22 Jan 1915 Appointed, Archbishop of Genova)
- Albino Pella (12 Apr 1915 – 17 May 1940 Died)
- Giuseppe Angrisani (1 Jul 1940 – 1 Mar 1971 Retired)
- Carlo Cavalla (1 Mar 1971 – 3 Jun 1995 Retired)
- Germano Zaccheo (3 Jun 1995 – 20 Nov 2007 Died)
- Alceste Catella (15 May 2008 – 2017)
- Gianni Sacchi (31 Jul 2017 - )

== See also ==
- List of Catholic dioceses in Italy

== Sources ==
=== Episcopal lists ===
- Gams, Pius Bonifatius (1873). Series episcoporum Ecclesiae catholicae: quotquot innotuerunt a beato Petro apostolo (in Latin). Ratisbon: Typis et Sumptibus Georgii Josephi Manz. p. 813. Supplementum I, p. 44.
- Ritzler, Remigius; Sefrin, Pirminus (1958). Hierarchia catholica medii et recentis aevi (in Latin). Vol. VI (1730-1799). Patavii: Messagero di S. Antonio.
- Ritzler, Remigius; Sefrin, Pirminus (1968). Hierarchia Catholica medii et recentioris aevi (in Latin). Vol. VII (1800–1846). Monasterii: Libreria Regensburgiana.
- Remigius Ritzler; Pirminus Sefrin (1978). Hierarchia catholica Medii et recentioris aevi (in Latin). Vol. VIII (1846–1903). Il Messaggero di S. Antonio.
- Pięta, Zenon (2002). Hierarchia catholica medii et recentioris aevi (in Latin). Vol. IX (1903–1922). Padua: Messagero di San Antonio. ISBN 978-88-250-1000-8.

=== Studies ===
- Bima, Palemone Luigi (1836). Serie cronologica dei romani pontefici e degli arcivescovi e vescovi del Piemonte (in Italian). Torino: dalla Stamperia Ghiringhello. pp. 171–175.
- Cappelletti, Giuseppe (1858). Le chiese d'Italia: dalla loro origine sino ai nostri giorni (in Italian). Vol. decimoquarto (XIV). Venice: G. Antonelli. pp. 565–594.
- Rolfo, Rafaella; Visconti, Maria Carla (2016). "La Cattedrale di Sant’Evasio a Casale Monferrato fra storia e restauri," (in Italian), in: "Monferrato Arte e Storia"- n. 28, dicembre 2016, pp. 75–88.
- Minina, G. (1887). Della Chiesa casalese. Il Santo patrono. La cattedrale. I vescovi. Casale, 1887.

==== Acknowledgment ====
- This article was based in part on its it:Diocesi di Casale Monferrato counterpart in the Italian Wikipedia as retrieved on 3 October 2007.

=== External links ===
- La Vita Casalese (in Italian) Weekly newspaper with web supplement offering news and comment on the Diocese of Casale Monferrato, published by Editrice Fondazione Sant'Evasio - Casale Monf. (AL)
- MonferratoArte (in Italian) A historical and bibliographical directory of artists active in the extra-urban churches of the Diocese of Casale Monferrato.
