= Roman Catholic Diocese of Ferentino =

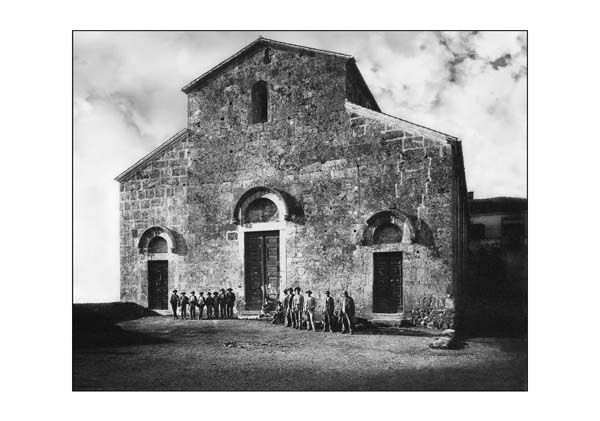
Cathedral of Ss. Giovanni e Paolo

The Roman Catholic Diocese of Ferentino existed until 1986, when it was united into the new diocese of Frosinone-Veroli-Ferentino.

== History ==
It is said, by Ferdinand Ughelli, that in the time of Emperor Constantine, in the 1st third of the fourth century, Ferentino had its own bishop; but the first bishop known by name is Bassus, at the end of the 5th century. Bishop Redemptus (about 570) is mentioned in the Dialogues of Gregory the Great, but Redemptus was bishop of Ferentum in Tuscany, not Ferentinum in Latium. Pope Gregory also refers to a Bishop Boniface, but he was a bishop of Ferentum in Tuscany.

=== Diocesan reorganization ===
The Second Vatican Council, in order to ensure that all Catholics received proper spiritual attention, decreed the reorganization of the diocesan structure of Italy and the consolidation of small and struggling dioceses, in particular those with financial and personnel problems. It also decreed that the natural population units of people, together with the civil jurisdictions and social institutions that compose their organic structure, should be preserved as far as possible as units.

On 18 February 1984, the Vatican and the Italian State signed a new and revised concordat. Based on the revisions, a set of Normae was issued on 15 November 1984, which was accompanied in the next year, on 3 June 1985, by enabling legislation. According to the agreement, the practice of having one bishop govern two separate dioceses at the same time, aeque personaliter, was abolished. This applied to the dioceses of Veroli and Frosinone. The Vatican therefore continued consultations which had begun under Pope John XXIII for the merging of dioceses. On 30 September 1986, Pope John Paul II ordered that the dioceses of Veroli, Frosinone, and Ferentino be merged into one diocese with one bishop, with the Latin title Dioecesis Frusinatensis-Verulana-Ferentina. The seat of the diocese was to be in Frosinone, whose cathedral was to serve as the cathedral of the merged dioceses. The cathedrals in Veroli and Ferentino were to become co-cathedrals, and the cathedral Chapters were each to be a Capitulum Concathedralis. There was to be only one diocesan Tribunal, in Frosinone, and likewise one seminary, one College of Consultors, and one Priests' Council. The territory of the new diocese was to include the territory of the former dioceses of Veroli, Frosinone, and Ferentino.

== Bishops of Ferentino ==
=== to 1200 ===
...

- Bassus (attested 487–499)
- Innocentius (attested 501)

...

- Bonus (attested 556)

...

- Luminosus (attested 595)

...
[Agnellus]
...

- Bonitus (attested 649)

...

- Agnellus (attested 721)

...

- Stephanus (attested 761)
- Sergius (attested 769)

...
[Joannes (9th cent.?)]
...

- Adrianus (attested 853)
- Petrus (attested 861)

...

- Romanus (attested 973–974)

...

- Dominicus (attested 993)
- Aifredus (attested 998–999)
- Benedictus (attested 1015)

...

- Augustinus (attested 1106–1113)
- Placidus (d. 1130)

...

- Trasmondo Sognino (1150)
- Ubaldus (1150)
- Rodulfus (1160–1191)
- Berardus (1191–1203)

=== 1200 to 1500 ===
- Albert Longhi (1203 – ? )
- Donatus
- Jacobus de Velletri, O.Min. (after 1252)
- Jacobus, O.P.
- Landolfo Rossi (1298–1303)
- Berardus (1304– ? )
- Philippus (1318–1348)
- Pietro Ruggeri (1348–1374?)
- Albertus de Carreto, O.E.S.A. (1374–c. 1392) Roman Obedience
- Gilbertus da Ferentino, O.Min. (1379– ? ) Avignon Obedience
- Giovanni Bonifacio Panella (1392–1395) Roman Obedience
- Angelo Vecchio, O.Min. (1395– ? ) Avignon Obedience
- Niccolò Vincioni (1395–1410) Roman Obedience
- Sixtus da Ferentino, O.Min. (1409–1433)
- Antonio Boccabella, O.F.M. (23 Dec 1435 – 24 Jan 1445)
- Giovanni Tricarico, O.S.A. (12 Feb 1445 – 1453)
- Antonio Laurenti (28 Sep 1453 – 1498)
- Pietro de Fenestrosa (1498–1499)
- Francesco Filipperi (1499–1510)

=== 1500 to 1800 ===
- Tranquillo de Macarazzi (1510–1548)
- Sebastiano Antonio Pighini (4 Jun 1548 – 1550)
- Dionisio de Robertis, O.S.M. (30 May 1550 –1554)
- Aurelio Tibaldeschi, O.S.Io.Hieros. (30 Apr 1554 – 1584)
- Silvio Galassi (3 Jun 1585 – 1591)
- Orazio Ciceroni (31 Jul 1591 – 1603)
- Fabrizio Campani (7 Apr 1603 – 15 Jun 1605)
- Dionigi Morelli (5 Aug 1605 – 13 Oct 1612)
- Ennio Filonardi (19 Nov 1612 – 1644)
- Enea di Cesare Spennazzi (23 May 1644 – 1658)
- Ottavio Roncioni (8 Jul 1658 –1676)
- Giovanni Carlo Antonelli (1677–1694)
- Valeriano Cierchielli (1694–1718 Resigned)
- Simone Gritti (1718–1729)
- Fabrizio Borgia (1729–1754)
- Pietro Paolo Tosi (16 Sep 1754 – 31 Mar 1798)

Sede vacante (1798–1800)

=== since 1800 ===
- Nicola Buschi (11 Aug 1800 – 23 Sep 1813 Died)
- Luca Amici (15 Mar 1815 – 8 Feb 1818 Died)
- Gaudenzio Patrignani, O.F.M. Obs. (25 May 1818 – 15 Feb 1823 Died)
- Giuseppe-Maria Lais (10 Mar 1823 – 18 Jan 1836 Died)
- Vincenzo Macioti (1 Feb 1836 – 5 Aug 1840 Died)
- Giovanni Giuseppe Canali (14 Dec 1840 – 24 Jan 1842 Resigned)
- Antonio Benedetto Antonucci (22 Jul 1842 – 25 Jul 1844 Appointed, Titular Archbishop of Tarsus)
- Bernardo-Maria Tirabassi (20 Jan 1845 – 2 Jan 1865 Died)
- Gesualdo Vitali (27 Mar 1865 – 31 Dec 1879 Died)
- Pietro Facciotti (27 Jan 1880 – 19 Apr 1897 Resigned)
- Domenico Bianconi (19 Apr 1897 – 12 Jun 1922 Died)
- Alessandro Fontana (11 Dec 1922 – 21 Dec 1941 Died)
- Tommaso Leonetti (14 Apr 1942 – 10 Jul 1962 Appointed, Archbishop of Capua)
- Costantino Caminada (21 Jul 1962 – 6 Nov 1972 Died)
- Umberto Florenzani (27 Jan 1973 – 21 Dec 1973 Appointed, Bishop of Anagni)
- Michele Federici (21 Dec 1973 – 23 Nov 1980 Died)
- Angelo Cella, M.S.C. (6 Jun 1981 –1986)

The diocese of Veroli-Frosinone was vacant from 1980 to 1986; on 30 September 1986 Cella was appointed bishop of the newly united diocese of Frosinone-Veroli-Ferentino.

== Books ==
=== Episcopal lists ===
- Eubel, Conradus, ed. (1913). Hierarchia catholica (in Latin). Vol. Tomus 1 (second ed.). Münster: Libreria Regensbergiana.
- Eubel, Conradus, ed. (1914). Hierarchia catholica (in Latin). Vol. Tomus 2 (second ed.). Münster: Libreria Regensbergiana.
- Gulik, Guilelmus (1923). Eubel, Conradus (ed.). Hierarchia catholica (in Latin). Vol. Tomus 3 (second ed.). Münster: Libreria Regensbergiana.
- Gams, Pius Bonifatius (1873). Series episcoporum Ecclesiae catholicae: quotquot innotuerunt a beato Petro apostolo (in Latin). Ratisbon: Typis et Sumptibus Georgii Josephi Manz. pp. 691–692.
- Gauchat, Patritius (Patrice) (1935). Hierarchia catholica (in Latin). Vol. Tomus IV (1592-1667). Münster: Libraria Regensbergiana.
- Ritzler, Remigius; Sefrin, Pirminus (1952). Hierarchia catholica medii et recentis aevi (in Latin). Vol. Tomus V (1667-1730). Patavii: Messagero di S. Antonio.
- Ritzler, Remigius; Sefrin, Pirminus (1958). Hierarchia catholica medii et recentis aevi (in Latin). Vol. Tomus VI (1730-1799). Patavii: Messagero di S. Antonio.
- Ritzler, Remigius; Sefrin, Pirminus (1968). Hierarchia Catholica medii et recentioris aevi (in Latin). Vol. VII (1800–1846). Monasterii: Libreria Regensburgiana.
- Ritzler, Remigius; Sefrin, Pirminus (1978). Hierarchia catholica Medii et recentioris aevi (in Latin). Vol. VIII (1846–1903). Il Messaggero di S. Antonio.
- Pięta, Zenon (2002). Hierarchia catholica medii et recentioris aevi (in Latin). Vol. IX (1903–1922). Padua: Messagero di San Antonio. ISBN 978-88-250-1000-8.

=== Studies ===
- Cappelletti, Giuseppe (1847). Le chiese d'Italia della loro origine sino ai nostri giorni (in Italian). Vol. Tomo sesto (6). Venezia: G. Antonelli. pp. 391–432.
- Kehr, Paul Fridolin (1907). Italia pontificia (in Latin). Vol. II: Latium. Berlin: Weidmann.
- Morosini, Luigi (1905). Notizie storiche della città di Ferentino: conferenza (in Italian). Roma: Unione Cooperativa Editrice.
- Schwartz, Gerhard (1907). Die Besetzung der Bistümer Reichsitaliens unter den sächsischen und salischen Kaisern: mit den Listen der Bischöfe, 951-1122. Leipzig: B.G. Teubner. (in lang|de)
- Ughelli, Ferdinando; Coleti, Niccolo (1717). Italia sacra (in Latin). Vol. Tomus primus. Venice: Sebastianus Coletus. pp. 672–680. X, p. 263.
