= Ferentino =

- Comune
- Comune di Ferentino
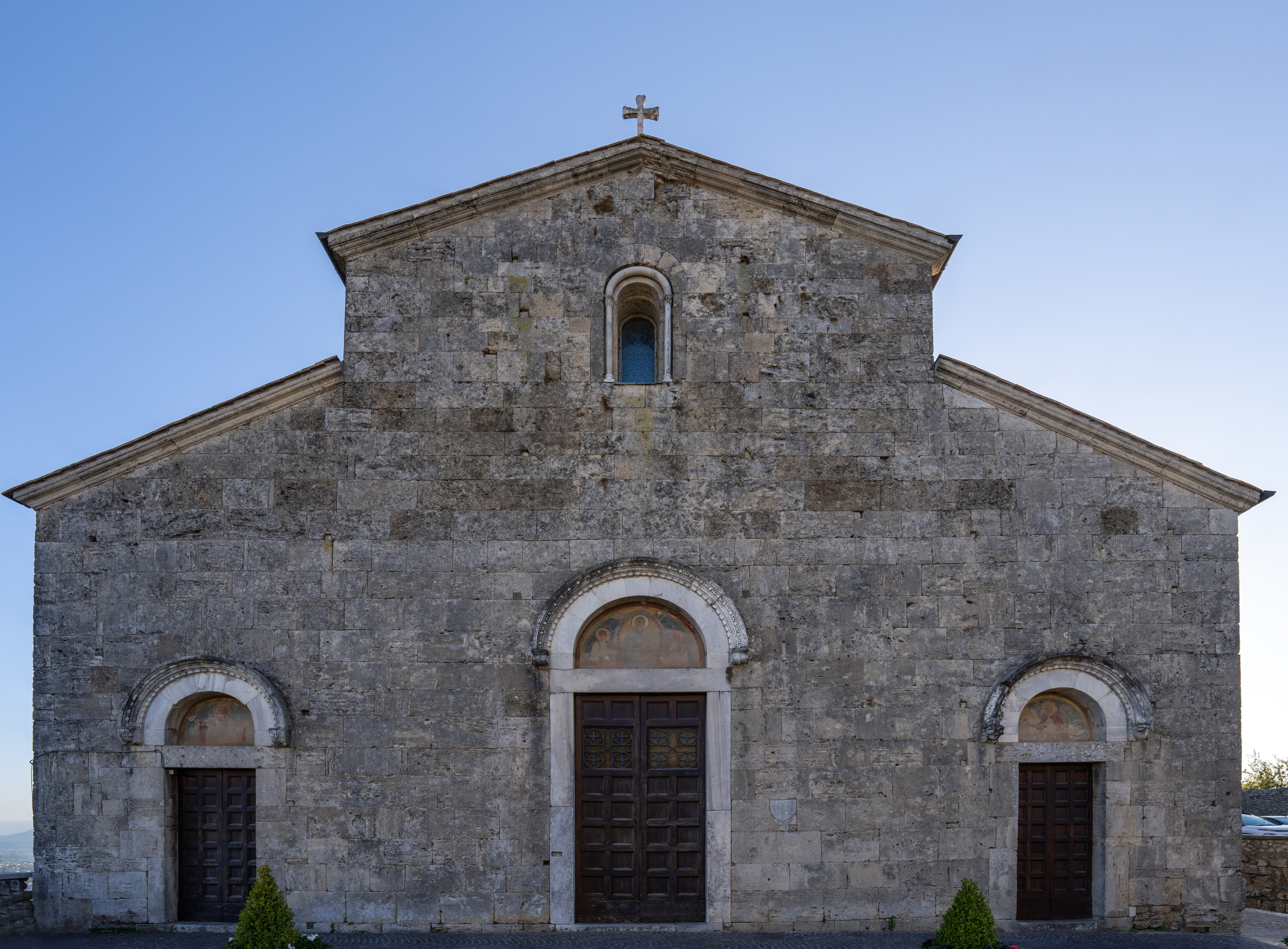
- Cathedral of Saints John and Paul.

- Coat of arms

- Location within Italy Location within Lazio
- Coordinates: 41°41′N 13°15′E
- Country: Italy
- Region: Lazio
- Province: Frosinone (FR)
- Frazioni: Porciano

Government
  - Mayor: Piergianni Fiorletta

Area
  - Total: 80 km^{2} (31 sq mi)
- Elevation: 393 m (1,289 ft)

Population (31 July 2017)
  - Total: 21,049
  - Density: 260/km^{2} (680/sq mi)
- Demonym: Ferentinesi or Ferentinati
- Time zone: UTC+1 (CET)
  - Summer (DST): UTC+2 (CEST)
- Postal code: 03013
- Dialing code: 0775
- Patron saint: St. Ambrose
- Saint day: May 1
- Website: Official website

Ferentino is a town and comune in Italy, in the province of Frosinone, Lazio, 65 kilometres (40 mi) southeast of Rome. It is situated on a hill 400 metres (1,312 feet) above sea level, in the Monti Ernici area.

== History ==
Ferentinum was a town of the Hernici; it was captured from them by the Romans in 364 BC and took no part in the rising of 306 BC. The inhabitants became Roman citizens after 195 BC, and the place later became a municipium. It lay just above the Via Latina and, being a strong place, served for the detention of hostages.

From 1198 to 1557 it was the seat of the Papal rectorate of Campagna and Marittima province.

Strong in textiles (linen and embroidery) and handicraft (clay bricks from Fornaci Giorgi), after World War II Ferentino experienced a heavy industrial growth, mainly in pharmaceuticals.

== Main sights ==
Ferentino still possesses remains of ancient fortifications. The lower portion of the outer walls, which probably did not stand free, is built of roughly hewn blocks of a limestone which naturally splits into horizontal layers; above this in places is walling of rectangular blocks of tuff. Two gates, the Porta Maggiore, a double gate constructed entirely of rectangular blocks of tuff, and the Porta Sanguinaria (with an arch with tuff voussoirs), are preserved. Outside this gate, the testament of Aulus Quinctilius Priscus inscribed in the rock.

The highest part of the town, the acropolis (2nd-1st centuries BC), is fortified also; it has massive retaining walls similar to those of the lower town. At the eastern corner, under the present episcopal palace, the construction is somewhat more careful. A projecting rectangular terrace has been erected, supported by walls of quadrilateral blocks of limestone arranged almost horizontally; while upon the level thus formed a building of rectangular blocks of local travertine was raised. The projecting cornice of this building bears two inscriptions of the period of Sulla, recording its construction by two censors (local officials); and in the interior, which contains several chambers, there is an inscription of the same censors over one of the doors, and another over a smaller external side door. The windows lighting these chambers come immediately above the cornice, and the wall continues above them again. The whole of this construction probably belongs to one period.

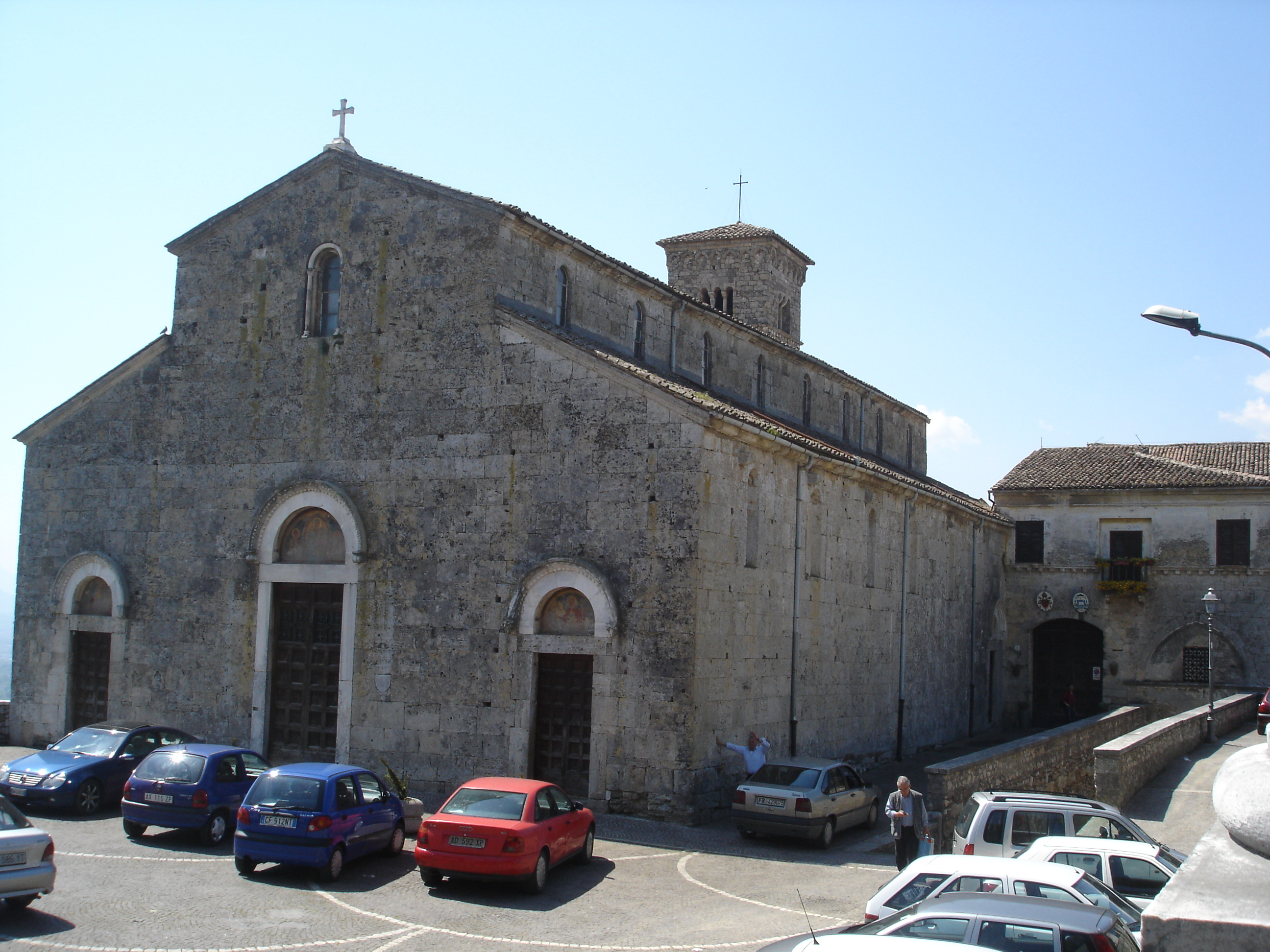
The Cathedral of Ferentino.

The Cathedral of Sts John and Paul occupies a part of the level top of the ancient acropolis; it was reconstructed on the site of an older church in 1099–1118; the interior was modernized in 1693, but was restored to its original form in 1902. It contains a fine ciborium in the Cosmatesque style and a 12th-century mosaic pavement.

The Gothic church of Santa Maria Maggiore, in the lower town (13th-14th century), has a very fine exterior; the interior, the plan of which is a perfect rectangle, has been spoiled by restoration. Other religious edifices include the Benedictine church of San Valentino (mostly remade after World War II, but still including 13th-century frescoes) and the Romanesque monastery of Sant'Antonio Abate, which housed the remains of Pope Celestine V until 1327. The latter's heart is preserved in the small convent church of the Clarisse (17th century).

In 2021, Italy's Minister of Culture awarded €1.5 million to fund the first full excavation of the town's Roman theatre, which will be partially restored for community use.

== Twinned cities ==
- Ekaterinburg, Russia
- San Severino Marche, Italy
- Rockford, Illinois, United States

== See also ==
- Roman Catholic Diocese of Ferentino
- Roman Catholic Diocese of Frosinone-Veroli-Ferentino
