= Alessano =

Alessano Alexianòn (Greek)
- Comune
- Comune di Alessano
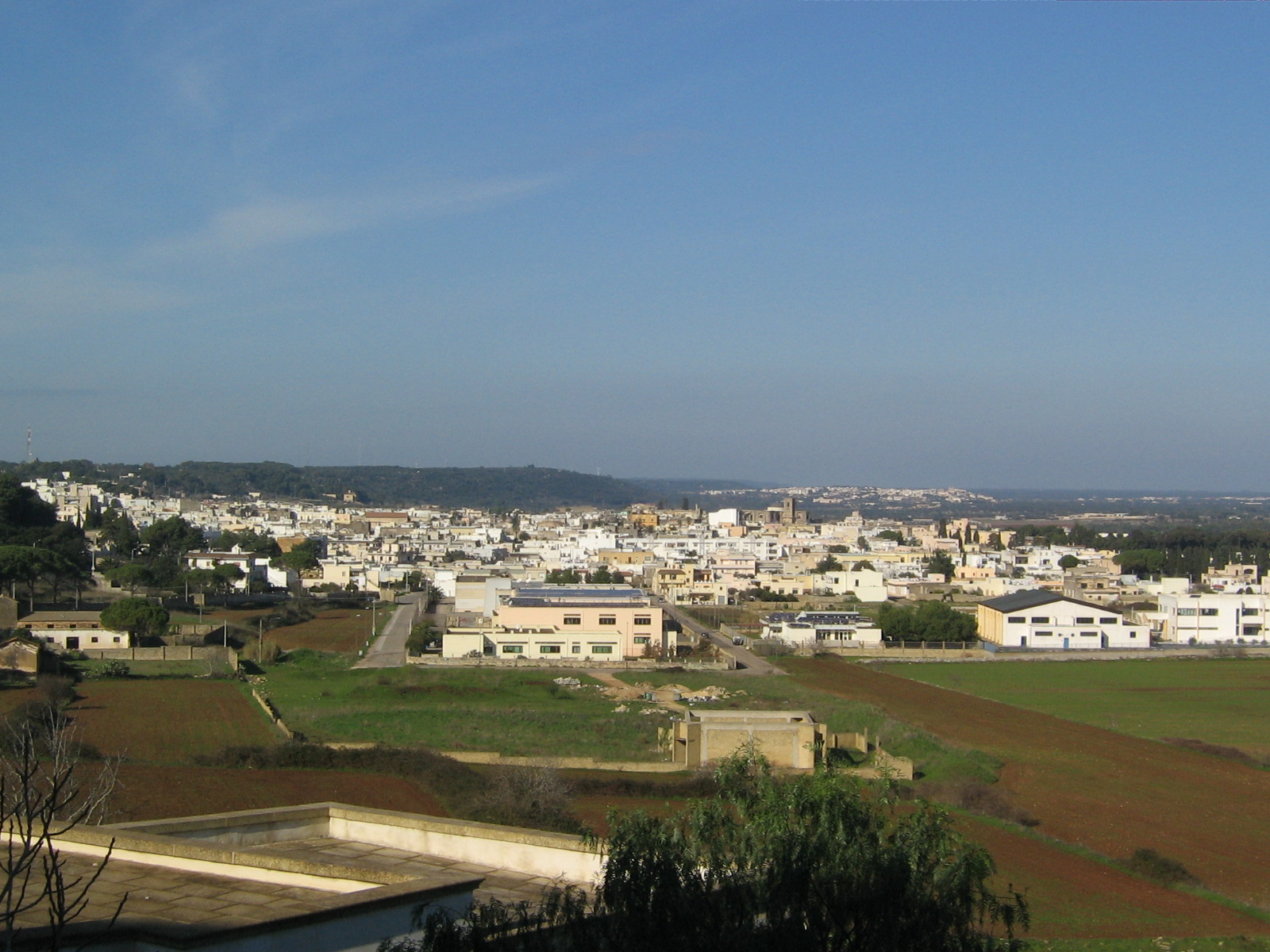
- View of Alessano

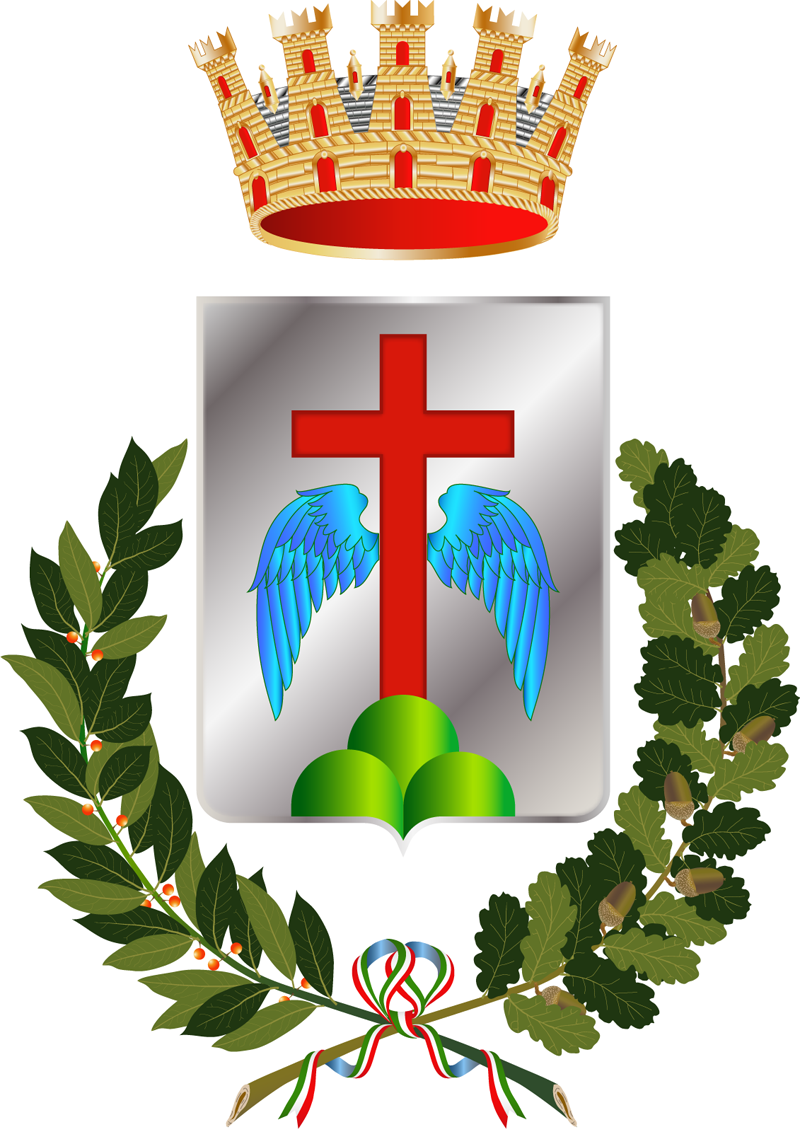
- Coat of arms

- Location of Alessano in Italy Alessano (Apulia)
- Coordinates: 39°53′N 18°20′E
- Country: Italy
- Region: Apulia
- Province: Lecce (LE)
- Frazioni: Marina di Novaglie, Montesardo

Government
  - Mayor: Osvaldo Stendardo

Area
  - Total: 28.69 km^{2} (11.08 sq mi)
- Elevation: 140 m (460 ft)

Population (22 July 2018)
  - Total: 6,391
  - Density: 222.8/km^{2} (576.9/sq mi)
- Demonym: Alessanesi
- Time zone: UTC+1 (CET)
  - Summer (DST): UTC+2 (CEST)
- Postal code: 73031
- Dialing code: 0833
- ISTAT code: 075002
- Patron saint: St. Trifone
- Saint day: Last Monday in July
- Website: Official website

Alessano (Ancient Greek: Ἀλεξιανόν, romanized: Alexianón) is a town and comune in the province of Lecce, part of Apulia region of south-east Italy.

== Main sights ==
- Mother Church of San Salvatore (late 18th century)
- Church of Sant'Antonio (late 16th-early 17th centuries)
- Church of Chapuchins
- Church of the Crucifix (1651)
- Ducal Palace, a fortified noble residence built in the late 15th century
