= Stefano Pendinelli =

Italian Roman Catholic saint

Saint Stefano Agricola
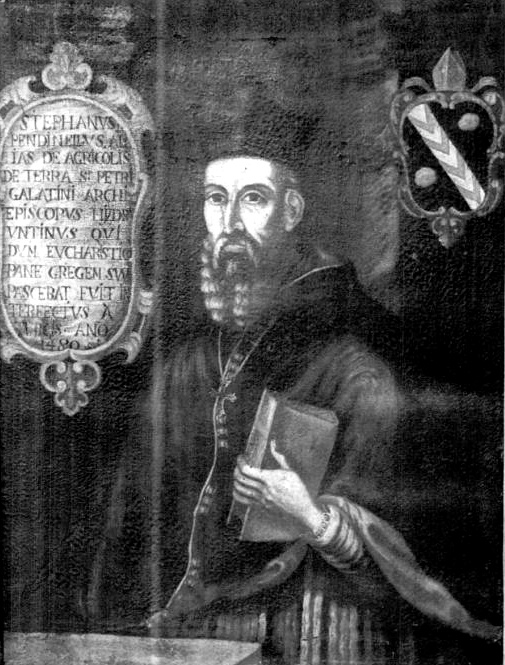
- The portrait of Pendinelli hanging in the Chiesa dell'Assunta della Chiesa Matrice, Galatina

Archbishop of Otranto, Martyr
- Born: 1403; Galatina, Kingdom of Naples
- Died: 11 August 1480 (aged 76–77); Otranto, Kingdom of Naples
- Venerated in: Catholic Church
- Canonized: 12 May 2013, Saint Peter's Square, Vatican City, by Pope Francis
- Major shrine: Cathedral of Otranto, Apulia, Italy
- Feast: 14 August
- Patronage: Otranto

Stefano Agricola (also Stefano de Agricola; 1403 – 11 August 1480) was the Roman Catholic archbishop of Otranto, Italy. He was slain in 1480, along with all his priests, by the Ottoman force that invaded Otranto. He is among the 813 martyrs of Otranto canonized by Pope Francis in 2013.

== Life ==
Stefano Agricola de Pendinellis was born in 1403 in Galatina and studied in Nardò, where he became bishop on 8 February 1436, shortly after the death of his uncle, a Franciscan friar. In 1451, he was appointed archbishop of Otranto. He assumed the archbishopric on 16 June.

== Martyrdom ==
On 28 July 1480 an Ottoman force commanded by Gedik Ahmed Pasha, consisting of 90 galleys, 40 galiots and other ships carrying a total of around 150 crew and 18,000 troops, landed beneath the walls of Otranto. The city strongly resisted the Ottoman assaults, but the garrison was unable to resist the bombardment for long. The garrison and all the townsfolk thus abandoned the main part of the city on 29 July, retreating into the citadel while the Ottomans began bombarding the neighboring houses.

When Gedik Ahmed asked the defenders to surrender, they refused, and so the Ottoman artillery resumed the bombardment. On 12 August, after a 15-day siege, the citadel was captured. In the massacre which followed, all men over 15 years old were killed and all the women and children were enslaved. According to some historical accounts, a total of 12,000 were killed and 5,000 enslaved, including victims from the territories of the Salentine peninsula around the city.

Some survivors and the city's clergy took refuge in the cathedral to pray with the elderly Archbishop Pendinelli. Gedik Ahmed ordered them to convert to Islam, but received a flat refusal and so broke into the cathedral with his men and killed all those inside. This included Pendinelli, who was cut down before the altar.

Accounts of means of his martyrdom differ. One account says that he was skewered and cut to pieces with scimitars before having his head cut off, put on a pike and carried around the city. Another account, given by Antonio de Ferrariis in his work De situ Japigiae, states that the archbishop, "after having heartened the population the previous day by the sacrament of the Eucharist, climbed from the crypt of the cathedral into the choir, and there, a martyr of the faith in Christ and dressed in ecclesiastical vestments, was murdered on his cathedra by the Turks, when they broke into the church." Yet another source claims that he was sawn in half with a wooden saw.

== Veneration ==
A portrait of Pendinelli hangs in the Church of the Assumption, Mother of the Church (Chiesa dell'Assunta della Chiesa Matrice) in his hometown of Galatina.

A canonical process for the martyrs of Otranto began in 1539 and ended on 14 December 1771, when Pope Clement XIV beatified the 800 killed on the Colle della Minerva and authorised their cult. At the request of the archdiocese of Otranto, the process was resumed and confirmed in full the previous process. On 6 July 2007, Pope Benedict XVI issued a decree recognising that the martyrs were killed "out of hatred for their faith." A miracle was confirmed in 2012.

The announcement of the canonization was made on 11 February 2013 by Pope Benedict XVI in the consistory in which Benedict also announced his intention to resign the papacy. Pendinelli was canonized with the other 812 martyrs of the Ottoman invasion by Pope Francis on 12 May 2013.
