= Gaetano Cossa =

Most Reverend Gaetano Cossa
- Archbishop of Otranto
- Church: Catholic Church
- Archdiocese: Archdiocese of Otranto
- In office: 1635–1657
- Predecessor: Fabrizio degli Antinori
- Successor: Gabriel Adarzo de Santander y Martínez de Viaí

Orders
- Consecration: 13 May 1635 by Francesco Maria Brancaccio

Personal details
- Died: 1657 Otranto, Italy

Archbishop Gaetano Cossa, C.R. (died 1657) was a Roman Catholic prelate who served as Archbishop of Otranto (1635–1657).

== Biography ==
Gaetano Cossa was ordained a priest in the Congregation of Clerics Regular of the Divine Providence. On 28 February 1633, he was selected as Archbishop of Otranto and confirmed on 7 May 1635 by Pope Urban VIII. On 13 May 1635, he was consecrated bishop by Francesco Maria Brancaccio, Cardinal-Priest of Santi XII Apostoli, with Giacomo Theodoli, Bishop of Forlì and Alessandro Suardi, Bishop of Lucera, serving as co-consecrators. He served as Archbishop of Otranto until his death in 1655 or 1657.

== Episcopal succession ==
Episcopal succession of Francesco Maria Brancaccio

While bishop, he was the principal consecrator of:

- Bruno Sciamanna, Bishop of Lucera (1637);

and the principal co-consecrator of:

- Carlo Maranta, Bishop of Giovinazzo (1637);
- Domenico Giordani, Bishop of Isernia (1637);
- Vencent Cavaselice, Bishop of Carinola (1640); and
- Gregorio Panzani, Bishop of Mileto (1640).

Catholic Church titles
Preceded by Fabrizio degli Antinori	Archbishop of Otranto; 1635–1657	Succeeded by Gabriel Adarzo de Santander y Martínez de Viaín
