= Martyrs of Otranto =

15th-century Roman Catholic martyrs

Saints Martyrs of Otranto
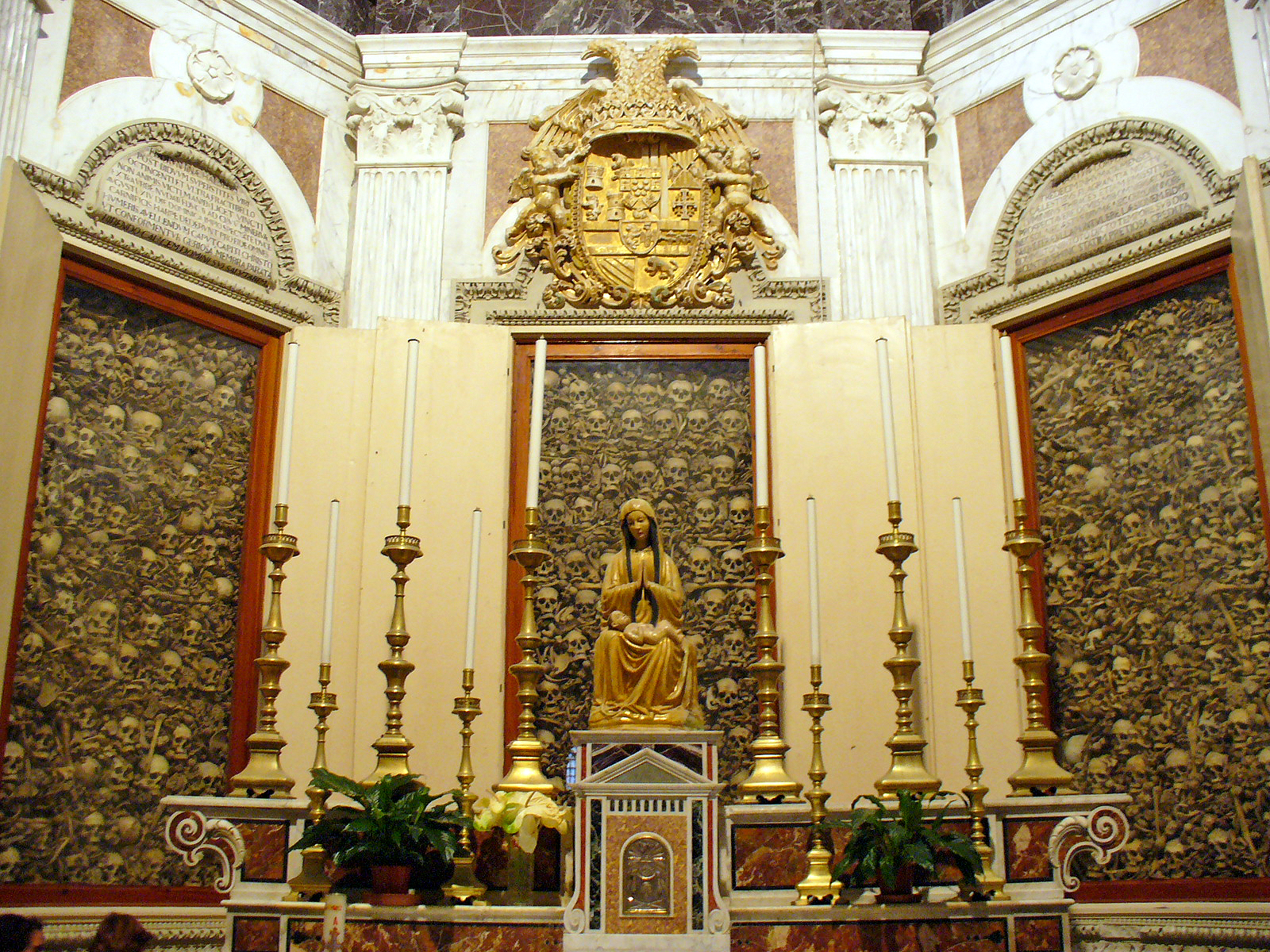
- Relics of the Martyrs of Otranto

Martyrs
- Born: Varies
- Died: 14 August 1480; Otranto, Italy
- Venerated in: Catholic Church
- Beatified: 14 December 1771 by Pope Clement XIV
- Canonized: 12 May 2013, Saint Peter's Square, Vatican City, by Pope Francis
- Major shrine: Cathedral of Otranto
- Feast: 14 August
- Patronage: Otranto, persecuted Christians

The Martyrs of Otranto, also known as Antonio Primaldo and companions, were 813 inhabitants of Otranto in Salento, Apulia, who were killed on 14 August 1480 after the city had fallen to an Ottoman force under Gedik Ahmed Pasha. According to a traditional account, the killings took place after the citizens had refused to convert to Islam.

== Background ==
The Ottoman ambitions in Italy were ended. Had Otranto surrendered to the Turks, the history of Italy might have been very different. But the heroism of the people of Otranto was more than a strategically decisive stand. What made the sacrifice of Otranto so remarkable was the willingness to die for the faith rather than reject Christ.

The siege of Otranto, with the martyrdom of its inhabitants, was the last significant military attempt by a Muslim force to conquer southern Italy. The slaughter was remembered by historians of the Risorgimento, such as Girolamo Arnaldi and Alfonso Scirocco, as a milestone in European history because the sacrifice saved the Italian Peninsula from Muslim conquest. The martyrs were presented as civic heroes representing the strength and fortitude of the Italian people.

== History ==
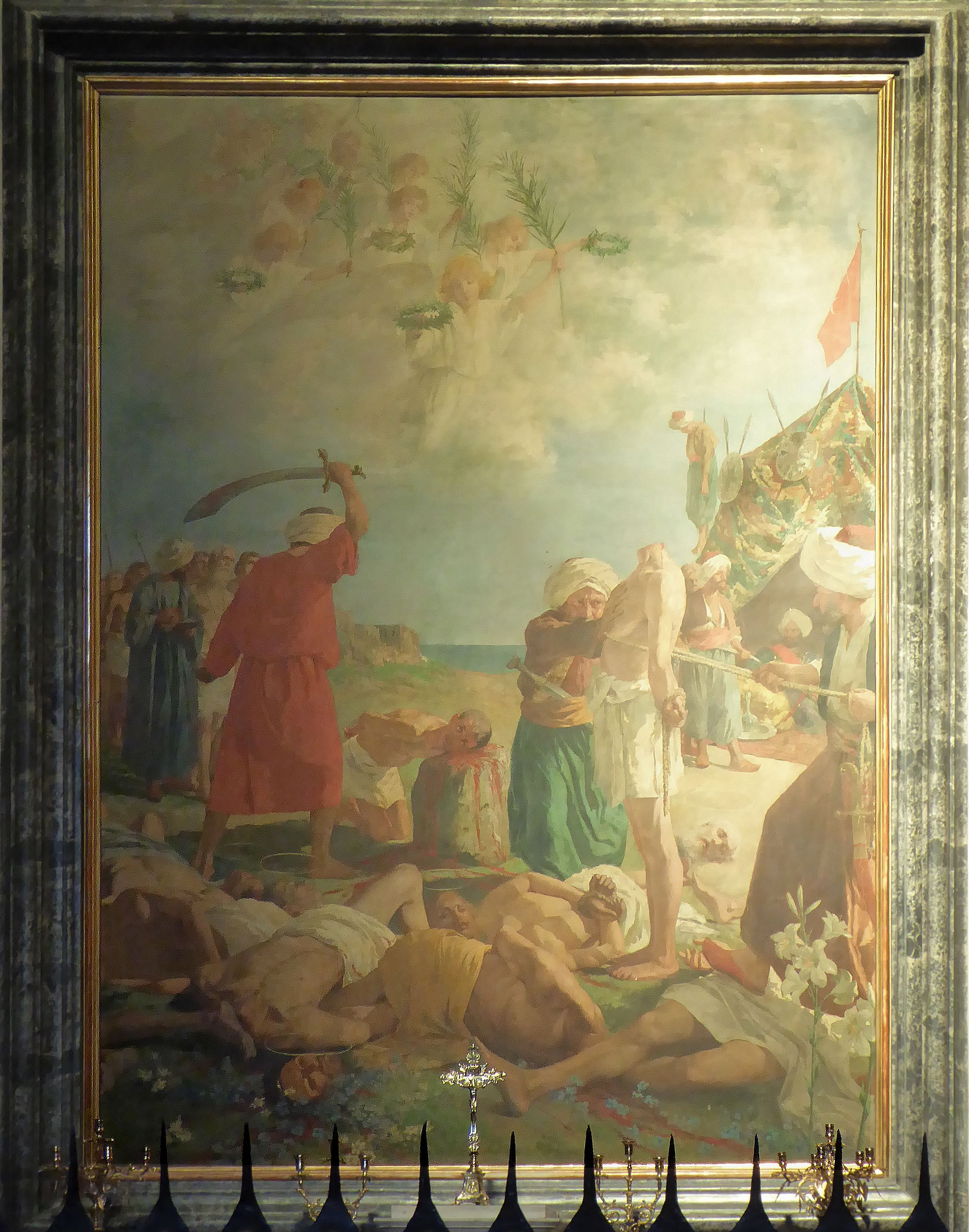
Painting in the Cathedral of Naples depicting the artist's conception of the massacre of Otranto citizens by the Ottomans in 1480. Antonio Primaldo's headless body remains standing despite a Turk's effort to push it over.

On 28 July 1480, an Ottoman force under Gedik Ahmed Pasha, 130 ships landed 18,000 troops beneath the walls of Otranto. Thought it strongly resisted the Ottoman assaults, the city garrison was beaten down by the Ottoman cannon.

The next day, the defenders and townsfolk retreated into the citadel, which was again bombarded. According to the chroniclers Giovanni Laggetto and Saverio de Marco, the invaders promised clemency if the city capitulated, but were met with defiance. A second Ottoman messenger "was slain with arrows and an Otranto guardsman flung the keys of the city into the sea". The bombardment resumed.

The townsfolk sent for help from King Ferdinand I of Naples, but most of his Aragonese militias were already committed in Tuscany. "Nearly seven eighths (350) of Otranto's militia slipped over the city walls and fled". The remaining fifty soldiers fought alongside the citizenry and dumped boiling oil and water onto the Ottomans scaling the ramparts between the cannonades.

The citadel fell on August 12 after a 15-day siege. Once the walls had been breached, the Ottomans fought their way in. In the cathedral, "they found Archbishop Stefano Agricolo, fully vested and crucifix in hand", awaiting them with Count Francesco Largo. "The archbishop was beheaded before the altar, his companions were sawn in half, and their accompanying priests were all murdered". After desecrating the cathedral, the Ottomans gathered the women and older children to be sold into Albanian slavery. Men over 15, small children and infants were slain.

According to some historical accounts, a total of 12,000 were killed and 5,000 enslaved, including victims from the territories of the Salentine Peninsula around the city.

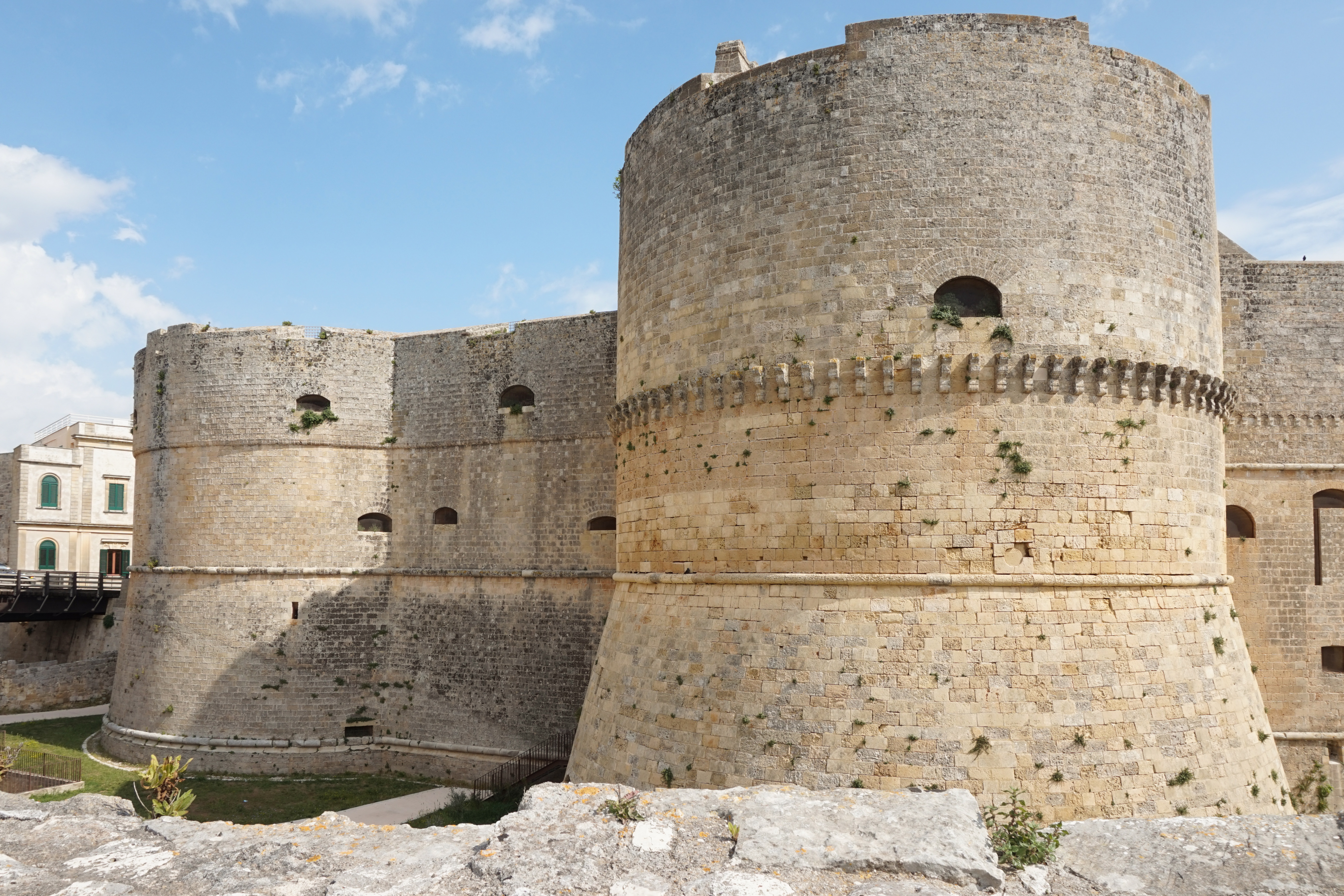
Castle of Otranto

800 able-bodied men were captured and told to convert to Islam or be slain. A tailor named Antonio Primaldo is said to have proclaimed, "Now it is time for us to fight to save our souls for the Lord. And since he died on the cross for us, it is fitting that we should die for him". The captives gave a loud cheer.

According to chroniclers, on 14 August they were led to the Hill of Minerva (later renamed the Hill of Martyrs), where they were to be executed, with Primaldo beheaded first. Instead of falling to the ground, Primaldo’s headless body remained standing and, despite efforts to push it over, remained upright until the last man was slain. One Muslim executioner, an Ottoman officer called Bersabei, is said to have witnessed the miracle and converted on the spot, being immediatedly set upon and impaled by his fellows.

Between August and September 1480, King Ferdinand of Naples, with the help of his cousin Ferdinand the Catholic and the Kingdom of Sicily, attempted to recapture Otranto. Fearing further Ottoman incursions, Alfonso of Aragon left his battles with the Florentines to lead a campaign to liberate Otranto from August 1480. The city was finally retaken in spring 1481 by Alfonso's troops, supported by forces of the Hungarian King Matthias Corvinus.

== Relics ==
On 13 October 1481 the bodies of the Otrantines were found to be incorrupt, and they were transferred to a reliquary in the city's cathedral. From 1485, some of the martyrs' remains were transferred to Naples and placed under the altar of Our Lady of the Rosary in the church of Santa Caterina a Formiello. The altar commemorated the final Christian victory over the Ottomans at the Battle of Lepanto in 1571. They were later moved to the reliquary chapel consecrated by Benedict XIII, and then to their present location under the altar. A recognitio canonica between 2002 and 2003 confirmed their authenticity.

In 1930 Monsignor Cornelio Sebastiano Cuccarollo, O.F.M., was made archbishop of Otranto, and as a sign of affection and recognition to his old diocese, he gave some of the relics to the Sanctuary of Santa Maria di Valleverde in Bovino, where he had been bishop from 1923 to 1930, and they are now in the crypt of its new basilica. Other relics of the martyrs are venerated in several locations in Apulia, particularly in Salento and also in Naples, Venice and Spain.

== Canonisation ==
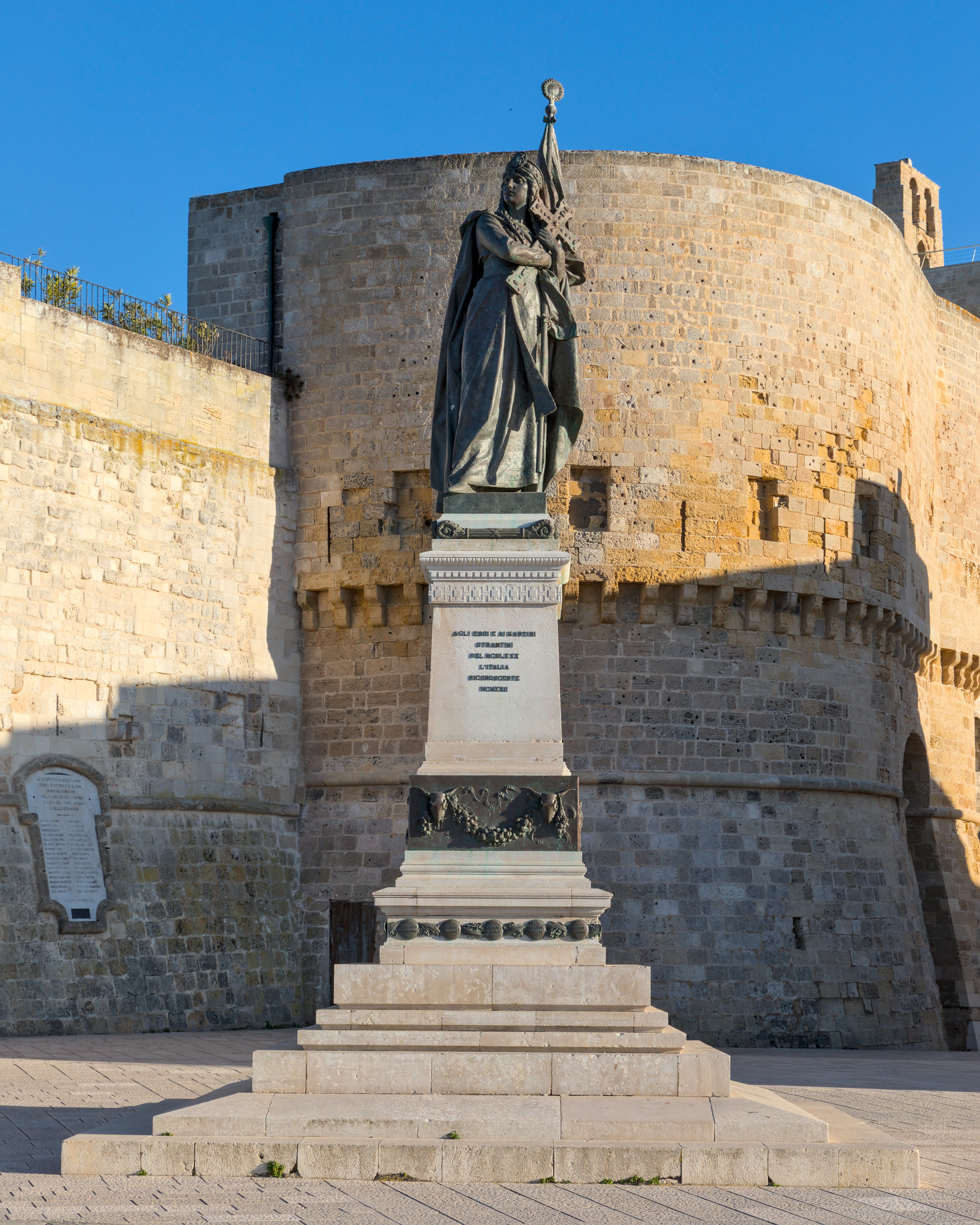
Monument to the heroes and martyrs of Otranto, in the city center.

A canonical process began in 1539. On 14 December 1771 Pope Clement XIV beatified the 800 killed on the Colle della Minerva and authorised their veneration.

At the request of the Archdiocese of Otranto, the process was resumed and confirmed in full the previous process. On 6 July 2007, Pope Benedict XVI issued a decree recognising that Primaldo and his fellow townsfolk had been killed "out of hatred for their faith". On 20 December 2012, Benedict gave a private audience to cardinal Angelo Amato, S.D.B., prefect of the Congregation for the Causes of Saints, and authorized the Congregation to promulgate a decree regarding the miracle of the healing of Sister Francesca Levote, which was attributed to the intercession of the Blessed Antonio Primaldo and his Companions.

They were beatified in 1771 and their canonisation date announced by Pope Benedict on 11 February 2013, the same day that he announced his intention to resign the papacy. They were canonised by Pope Francis on 12 May 2013. They are the patron saints of the city of Otranto and its archdiocese.

== Commentary ==
The dead would have included those who died both during the fall of the city and in the aftermath, including residents of Otranto, which had a population of about 6,000, as well as people in the surrounding area. Various accounts have been given of the events that led to their deaths. Some modern historians such as Nancy Bisaha and Francesco Tateo have questioned details of the traditional account. Tateo notes that the earliest contemporary sources describe execution of up to 1000 soldiers or citizens, as well as the local bishop, but they do not mention conversion as a condition for clemency, and martyrdom is not mentioned in contemporary Italian diplomatic dispatches or Ottoman chronicles. Bisaha argues that more of Otranto's inhabitants were likely to have been sold into slavery in the Ottoman Empire than to have been slaughtered.

However, other historians such as Paolo Ricciardi and Salvatore Panareo have argued that no information from the city reached the Christian world in the first year after the martyrdom, and only after Otranto had been reconquered were details of the massacre recounted by local witnesses.

The contemporary Ottoman historian Ibn Kemal explicitly justified the slaughter on religious grounds. Modern authors suggest it may have also have served as an exemplary punishment on the local population for its stiff resistance, which delayed the Ottoman advance and enabled the King of Naples to strengthen local fortifications.

From examining state archives at Modena, Daniele Palma suggests a pecuniary motive for the executions. The records reference bank transfers to ransom Otranto captives, with a typical ransom of 300 ducati, about three years' worth of earnings for a typical family. Those killed were likely farmers, shepherds, and others too poor to raise the ransom.

== Bibliography ==
- (in Italian) Paolo Ricciardi, Gli Eroi della Patria e i Martiri della Fede: Otranto 1480–1481, Vol. 1, Editrice Salentina, 2009
- (in Italian) Grazio Gianfreda, I beati 800 martiri di Otranto, Edizioni del Grifo, 2007
- (in French) Hervé Roullet, Les martyrs d'Otrante. Entre histoire et prophétie, Hervé Roullet, AVM Diffusion, Paray-le-Monial, France, 2019.

== See also ==
- Francesco Zurolo
- List of saints canonized by Pope Francis
- Otranto
- Ottoman conquest of Otranto
