= Vencent Cavaselice =

Italian Roman Catholic bishop (1590–1664)

Most Reverend Vencent Cavaselice
- Bishop of Carinola
- Church: Catholic Church
- Diocese: Diocese of Carinola
- In office: 1640–1664
- Predecessor: Onufrius Sersagli
- Successor: Paolo Airolo

Orders
- Consecration: 2 September 1640 by Giulio Cesare Sacchetti

Personal details
- Born: 1590 Salerno, Italy
- Died: 1664 (age 74) Carinola, Italy

Vencent Cavaselice (1590–1664) was a Roman Catholic prelate who served as Bishop of Carinola (1640–1664).

== Biography ==
Vencent Cavaselice was born in Salerno, Italy in 1590. On 13 August 1640, he was appointed during the papacy of Pope Urban VIII as Bishop of Carinola. On 2 September 1640, he was consecrated bishop by Giulio Cesare Sacchetti, Cardinal-Priest of Santa Susanna, with Pietro Antonio Spinelli, Archbishop of Rossano, and Gaetano Cossa, Archbishop of Otranto, serving as co-consecrators. He served as Bishop of Carinola until his death in 1664.

CAVASELICE

This family originated from Landuario called Cabasilice, a descendant of a woman from the Lombardy Princes of Salerno in 1086.

He enjoyed nobility in the city of Salerno at the Campo seat.

The firstborn branch was extinguished in 1844.

The noble Manganaro family of Salerno was extinguished in it.

There was a monument in the Cathedral of Naples, which was demolished with those of the Filomarino and Zurlo families, to build the Chapel of S. Gennaro

MONUMENTS. — In Salerno in the Church of S. Francesco and in Naples in the

Church of S. Lorenzo.

COUNTS. — San Severino.

MARCHESATI. — Santomango Piedmont 1668.

PAReNtaDI dei Cavaselice — Ajello — Assante — Bolino — Capograsso — Cap-poscrofa — di Caro - Clemente — Committee — Cretago — Filiola — Folliero —

Genoino - Giovine - of the Judge - Granite - Cricket - Guarna - Lembo -

Lopez — de Oliver — of Mayo — Manganaro — Mazza — Mollo — Morcal-di — Mormile — Pagano — della Pagliara — del Pezzo — Pinto — Quaranta - Ruggi — Ruggiero — Scaglione — Scattaretica — Sciabica — Setaro — Spitilli—

Ursone — de Vicariis — Villano and others.

Authors who talk about this family. — Alfano — Almagiore — Bacchus (Description of the Kingdom of Naples) — Engenio (Sacred Naples) — Lumaga — Mazza — Mazzella — Pacichelli — Sacco — de Sanctis (rhyme) - Summonte (History of the Kingdom of Naples). - Memorie delle famiglie nobili delle province meridionali d'Italia, Vol.

== External links and additional sources ==
- Cheney, David M. "Diocese of Carinola (Calina)". Catholic-Hierarchy.org. (for Chronology of Bishops) ^{[self-published]}
- Chow, Gabriel. "Titular Episcopal See of Carinola (Italy)". GCatholic.org. (for Chronology of Bishops) ^{[self-published]}

Catholic Church titles
Preceded by Onufrius Sersagli	Bishop of Carinola; 1640–1664	Succeeded by Paolo Airolo
