= Pedro Gamboa =

16th-century bishop of Carinola, Italy

Most Reverend Pedro Gamboa
- Bishop of Carinola
- Church: Catholic Church
- See: Diocese of Carinola
- In office: 1497–1510
- Successor: Giovanni Antonio Orfei

Orders
- Consecration: 30 September 1498 by Geremia Contugi

Personal details
- Died: 18 November 1510 Carinola, Italy

Pedro Gamboa (died 18 November 1510) was a Roman Catholic prelate who served as Bishop of Carinola (1497–1510).

== Biography ==
On 20 December 1497, Pedro Gamboa was appointed during the papacy of Pope Alexander VI as Coadjutor Bishop of Carinola. On 30 September 1498, he was consecrated bishop by Geremia Contugi, Bishop of Assisi, with Giuliano Maffei, Bishop of Bertinoro, and Carlo Bocconi, Bishop of Vieste, serving as co-consecrators. In 1501, he succeeded to the bishopric. He served as Bishop of Carinola until his death on 18 November 1510.

== External links and additional sources ==
- Cheney, David M. "Diocese of Carinola (Calina)". Catholic-Hierarchy.org. (for Chronology of Bishops) ^{[self-published]}
- Chow, Gabriel. "Titular Episcopal See of Carinola (Italy)". GCatholic.org. (for Chronology of Bishops) ^{[self-published]}

Catholic Church titles
Preceded by	Bishop of Carinola; 1497–1510	Succeeded by Giovanni Antonio Orfei
