= Juan Canuti =

Most Reverend Juan Canuti
- Bishop of Cariati e Cerenzia
- Church: Catholic Church
- Diocese: Diocese of Cariati
- In office: 1535–1545
- Predecessor: Taddeo Pepoli
- Successor: Marco Antonio Falconi
- Previous post: Bishop of Carinola (1530–1535)

Personal details
- Died: 1545

Juan Canuti (died 1545) was a Roman Catholic prelate who served as Bishop of Cariati e Cerenzia (1535–1545) and Bishop of Carinola (1530–1535).

== Biography ==
On 21 October 1530, Juan Canuti was appointed during the papacy of Pope Clement VII as Bishop of Carinola. On 15 January 1535, he was appointed during the papacy of Pope Paul III as Bishop of Cariati e Cerenzia. He served as Bishop of Cariati e Cerenzia until his death in 1545.

== External links and additional sources ==
- Cheney, David M. "Diocese of Carinola (Calina)". Catholic-Hierarchy.org. (for Chronology of Bishops) ^{[self-published]}
- Chow, Gabriel. "Titular Episcopal See of Carinola (Italy)". GCatholic.org. (for Chronology of Bishops) ^{[self-published]}
- Cheney, David M. "Diocese of Cariati". Catholic-Hierarchy.org. (for Chronology of Bishops) ^{[self-published]}
- Chow, Gabriel. "Diocese of Cariati (Italy)". GCatholic.org. (for Chronology of Bishops) ^{[self-published]}

Catholic Church titles
Preceded by Ferdinando D'Anna	Bishop of Carinola; 1530–1535	Succeeded by Taddeo Pepoli
Preceded by Taddeo Pepoli	Bishop of Cariati e Cerenzia; 1535–1545	Succeeded by Marco Antonio Falconi
