= Taddeo Pepoli =

Roman Catholic prelate

Most Reverend Taddeo Pepoli
- Bishop of Carinola
- Church: Catholic Church
- Diocese: Diocese of Carinola
- In office: 1535–1549
- Predecessor: Juan Canuti
- Successor: Bartolomeo Capranica
- Previous post: Bishop of Cariati e Cerenzia (1533–1535)

Personal details
- Died: 1549 Carinola, Italy

Taddeo Pepoli, O.S.B. (died 1549) was a Roman Catholic prelate who served as Bishop of Carinola (1535–1549) and Bishop of Cariati e Cerenzia (1533–1535).

== Biography ==
Taddeo Pepoli was ordained a priest in the Order of Saint Benedict. On 3 March 1533, he was appointed during the papacy of Pope Clement VII as Bishop of Cariati e Cerenzia. On 15 January 1535, he was appointed during the papacy of Pope Paul III as Bishop of Carinola. He served as Bishop of Carinola until his death in 1549.

While bishop, he was the principal consecrator of Evangelista Cittadini, Bishop of Alessano (1544); and the principal co-consecrator of François de Mauny, Bishop of Saint-Brieuc (1545).

== External links and additional sources ==
- Cheney, David M. "Diocese of Cariati". Catholic-Hierarchy.org. (for Chronology of Bishops) ^{[self-published]}
- Chow, Gabriel. "Diocese of Cariati (Italy)". GCatholic.org. (for Chronology of Bishops) ^{[self-published]}
- Cheney, David M. "Diocese of Carinola (Calina)". Catholic-Hierarchy.org. (for Chronology of Bishops) ^{[self-published]}
- Chow, Gabriel. "Titular Episcopal See of Carinola (Italy)". GCatholic.org. (for Chronology of Bishops) ^{[self-published]}

Catholic Church titles
Preceded by Tommaso Cortesi	Bishop of Cariati e Cerenzia; 1533–1535	Succeeded by Juan Canuti
Preceded by Juan Canuti	Bishop of Carinola; 1535–1549	Succeeded by Bartolomeo Capranica
