= Ottoman conquest of Otranto =

1480–1481 invasion of southern Italy

Battle of Otranto
- Part of the Ottoman wars in Europe and Hungarian–Ottoman Wars
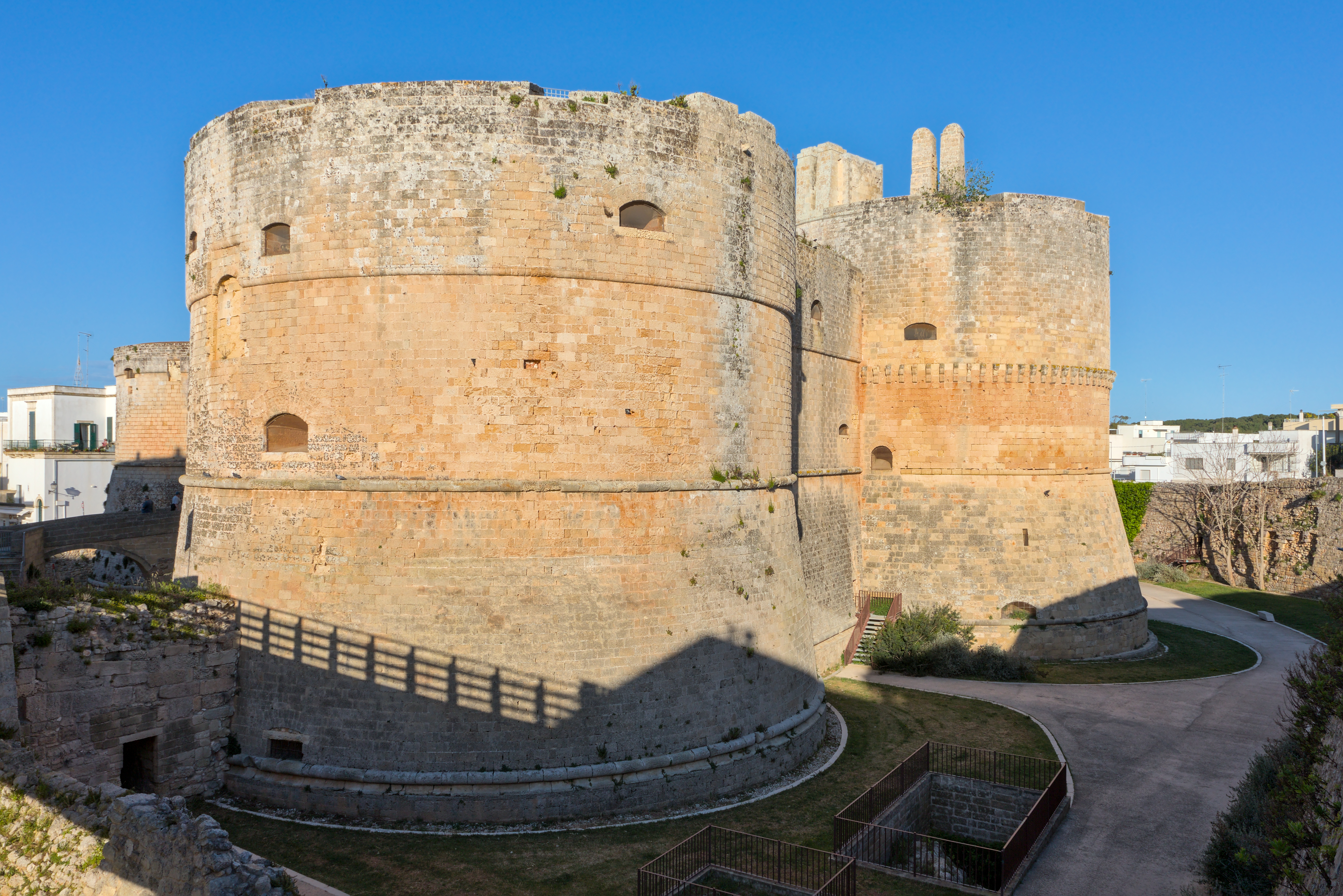
- Castle of Otranto
Date	28 July 1480 – 10 September 1481
Location	Otranto, Kingdom of Naples
Result	Ottoman conquest of Otranto in 1480; Christian reconquest of Otranto in 1481

Belligerents
Ottoman Empire	Kingdom of Naples; Papal States; Crown of Aragon; Kingdom of Sicily; Hungary

Commanders and leaders
Gedik Ahmed Pasha	Francesco Largo †; Alfonso, Duke of Calabria; Paolo Fregoso; Gaspare de Spes; Balázs Magyar

Strength
18,000 infantry; 700 cavalry; 140 ships	Kingdom of Naples: 20,000 infantry; Hungary: 2,100 Hungarian heavy infantry

Casualties and losses
Garrisoned forces surrender, 300 captured	12,000 killed in action; 5,000 enslaved

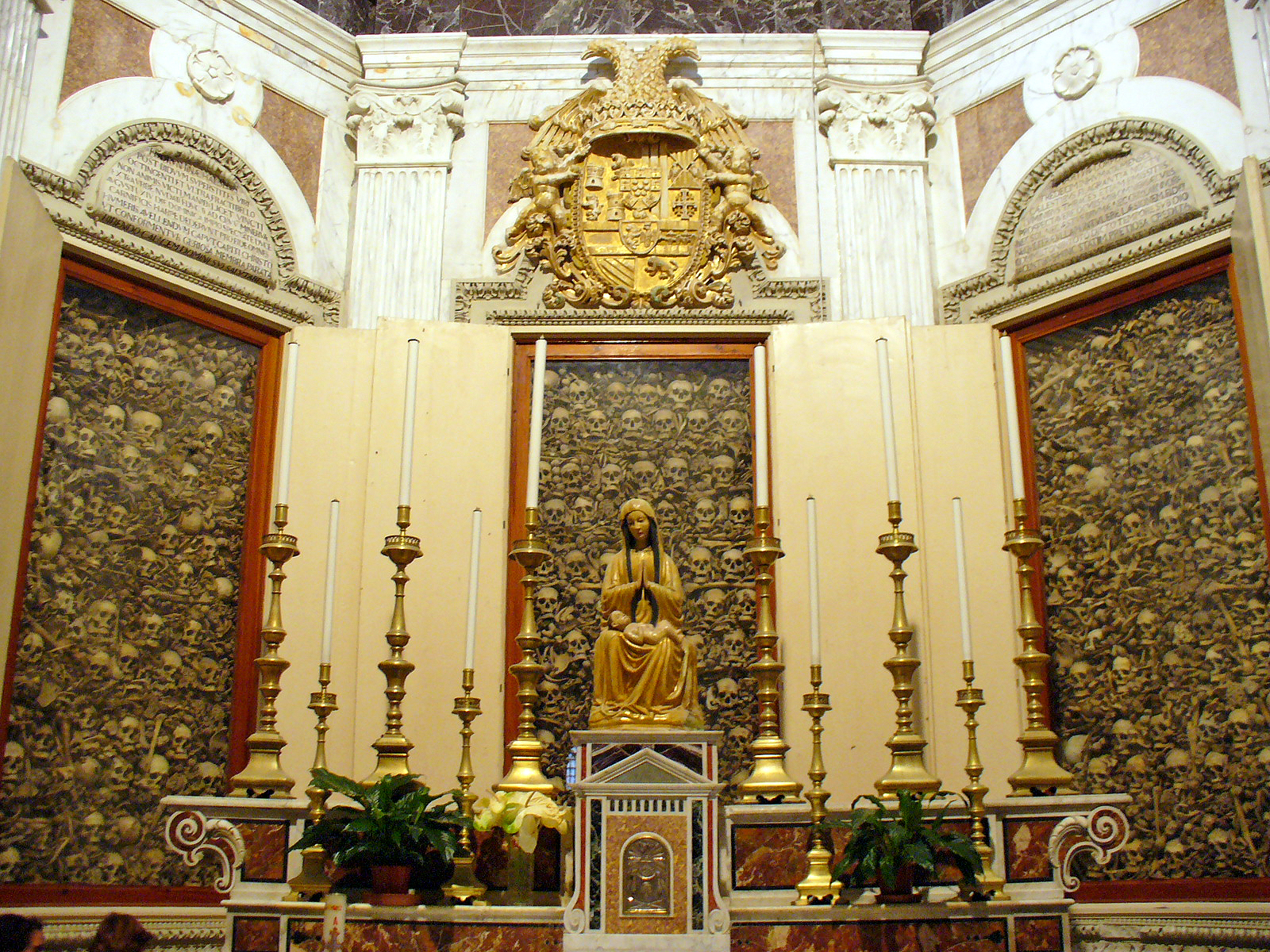
Relics of the Martyrs of Otranto inside Otranto Cathedral

In the summer of 1480, the Ottoman Empire invaded southern Italy, and laid siege to Otranto (Kingdom of Naples), finally capturing it on 11 August. This was their first outpost in Italy. According to a traditional account, more than 800 inhabitants were beheaded after the city had been captured, because they would not renounce their Christian faith. A year later, Otranto was surrendered by the Ottomans to Duke Alfonso of Calabria after a siege by Neapolitan troops, supported by a Papal fleet (under Paolo Fregoso of Genoa) and Hungarian forces, and amid uncertainty upon the death of sultan Mehmed II.

== Background and motive ==
In 1453, the Ottoman Sultan Mehmed II conquered the Byzantine capital of Constantinople. In 1479, the Venetians, a major naval power in the Mediterranean, had sued for peace with the Ottomans, agreeing to hand over Lesbos, Shkodër, and other territory in the Peloponnese, along with a symbolic tribute of 10,000 florins. There were rumours that the Venetians supported the subsequent Ottoman invasion of Italy: Sigismondo de’Conti stated that the Ottomans would not have attempted it without Venetian neutrality at the least. Venetian sources imply that the Signoria, through its new bailo in Constantinople, Battista Gritti, told the sultan that he would be within his rights to seize the former Byzantine cities of Brindisi, Taranto, and Otranto.

In early summer 1480, Kapudan-i Derya Gedik Ahmed Pasha received orders from Mehmed to cross the Strait of Otranto. Pasha was an experienced commander who had previously taken the islands of Lefkada, Kephalonia, and Zakynthos. The Ottoman fleet gathered near Vlorë and set off across the strait. A Venetian fleet stationed near Corfu apparently followed the Ottomans to the coast of Puglia before returning to Corfu.

== Siege and capture ==
Pasha had originally planned to land near Brindisi, however, a captured merchant had told him there were fewer defences further South, so the course was redirected to Otranto. On Friday 28th July, an Ottoman fleet of 140 ships, including 40 galleys, arrived near the city. The Ottomans landed a force of cavalry at Roca who quickly made their way to Otranto. The Ottomans laid siege with cannon and took the city on the 11th August. Of the 22,000 inhabitants, 12,000 were killed and 800 were taken as slaves. On the 14th, 800 citizens who refused to convert to Islam were executed on a nearby hill. The victims would be later declared martyrs by Pope Clement XIV and then canonised by Pope Francis in 2013.

After securing Otranto, the Ottomans began raiding toward Brindisi, Lecce, and Taranto. They imposed a tax of one ducat on each family and melted the church bells into cannon. However, the invaders' situation deteriorated as their provisions ran out and the locals refused to co-operate, with many leaving the area. The Ottomans relaxed their policies in response, relinquishing taxes for 10 years and allowing religious freedoms. The campaign was seen as the first step in a feared Ottoman conquest of Italy.

== Response and recapture ==
In September, King Ferdinand I of Naples set out for Otranto with his son Alfonso following later that month. They set up camp near the city, preventing Ottoman operations to the west, and the Ottomans eventually retreated behind the city walls in October. The Ottomans flatly refused to negotiate, rejecting Ferdinand's ransom of 800,000 gold ducats for the city, and instead demanded the surrender of several other cities in the region and threatening a full invasion of Italy.

The dire threat roused the Pope to organize a defense, sending money to Naples and negotiating a treaty between the Holy See, Naples, Hungary, Genoa, Milan, Ferrara, and Florence, though Venice refused to join the alliance.

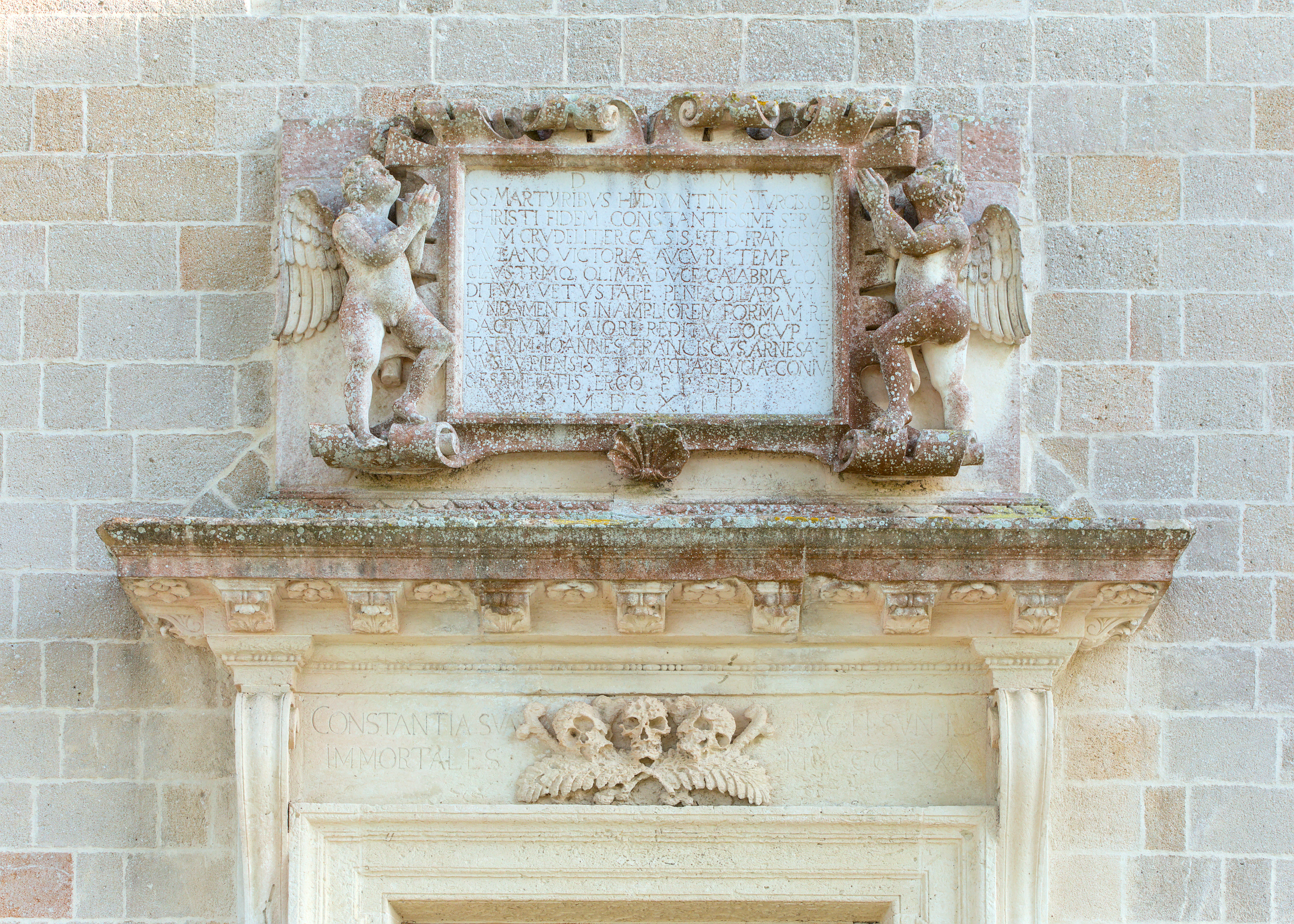
Plaque over the portal of Santa Maria dei Martiri, at the location where 800 inhabitants were supposedly beheaded.

Ottoman resistance to the Hungarian and Neapolitan forces wavered and eventually broke on 10th September 1481. Gedik Ahmed Pasha tried to carry on the fight in Italy after Mehmed II’s death but failed, with the Ottoman troops in Otranto being left to fend for themselves. A planned attack on Vlorë was discussed by the Pope and Ferdinand, but this never came to fruition.

Venice remained cautiously neutral even after Otranto’s reconquest, with the Venetian consul in Puglia told to congratulate Ferdinand on his victory, but only verbally, and to burn the diplomatic correspondence to avoid offending the Ottomans.

== Aftermath ==
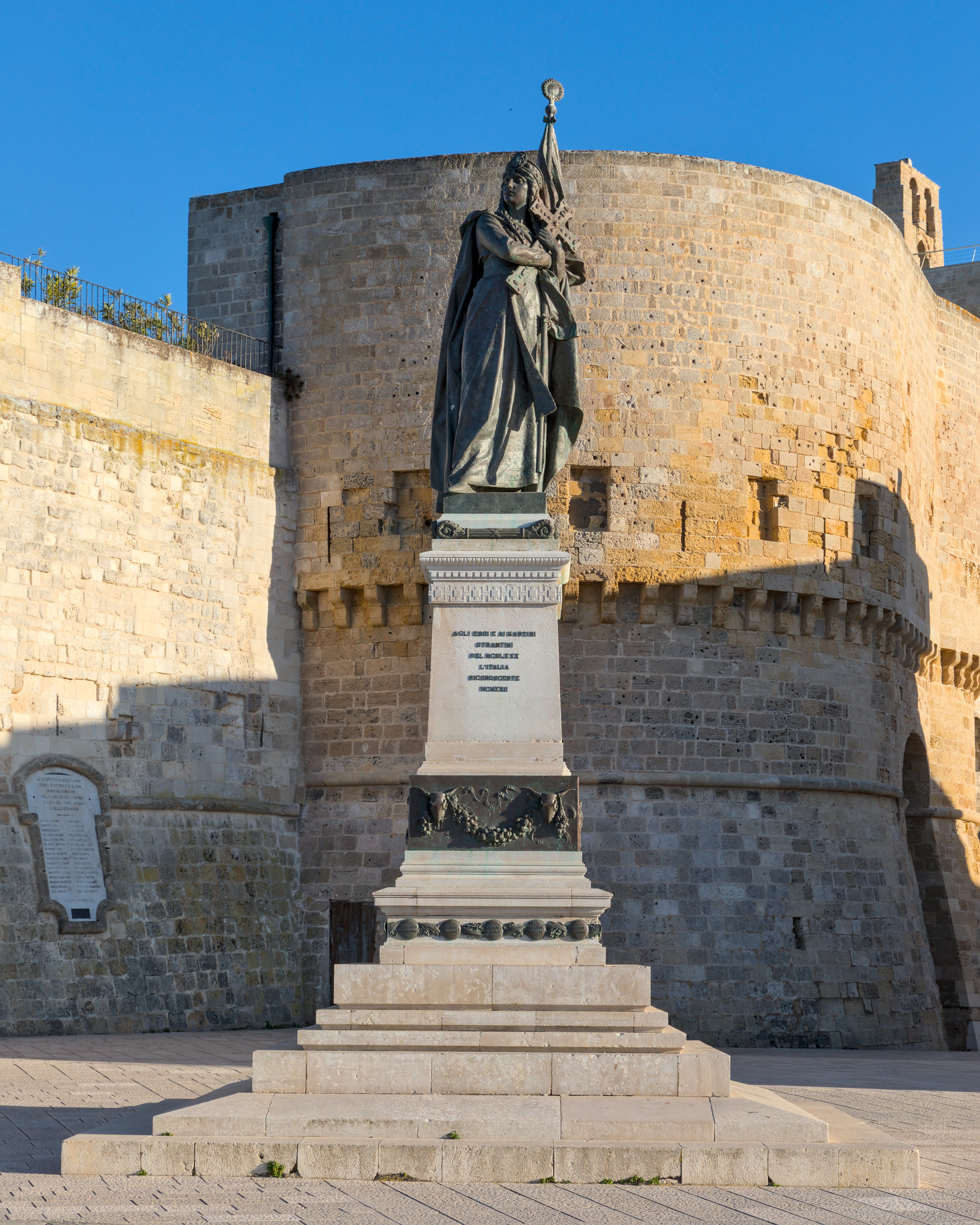
Monument to the heroes and martyrs of Otranto, in the city center.

The commander Gedik Ahmed Pasha was thought to be encouraging Sultan Mehmed to push the invasion further, but the campaign ended with the sultan's death in 1481. Antonio De Ferrariis Gelateo believed that if they had proceeded, the Ottomans could have incorporated Italy into the lands of Islam, however, the Ottomans had been obliterated by Skanderbegu and its albanian allies, preventing them from actually launching proper invasions in the Italian mainland.

The number of citizens, said to have been nearly 20,000 before the conquest, had decreased to 8,000 by the end of the century.

The Ottomans also briefly held Otranto once more in 1537, losing it to Barbossa a month later, and the city remained under Neapolitan rule thereafter.

== See also ==
- History of Islam in southern Italy
- Martyrs of Otranto
- Da Vinci's Demons (fictional work, part of which portrays the invasion)
