= Otranto Cathedral =

Cathedral in Italy

Coordinates: 40.1458°N 18.4910°E

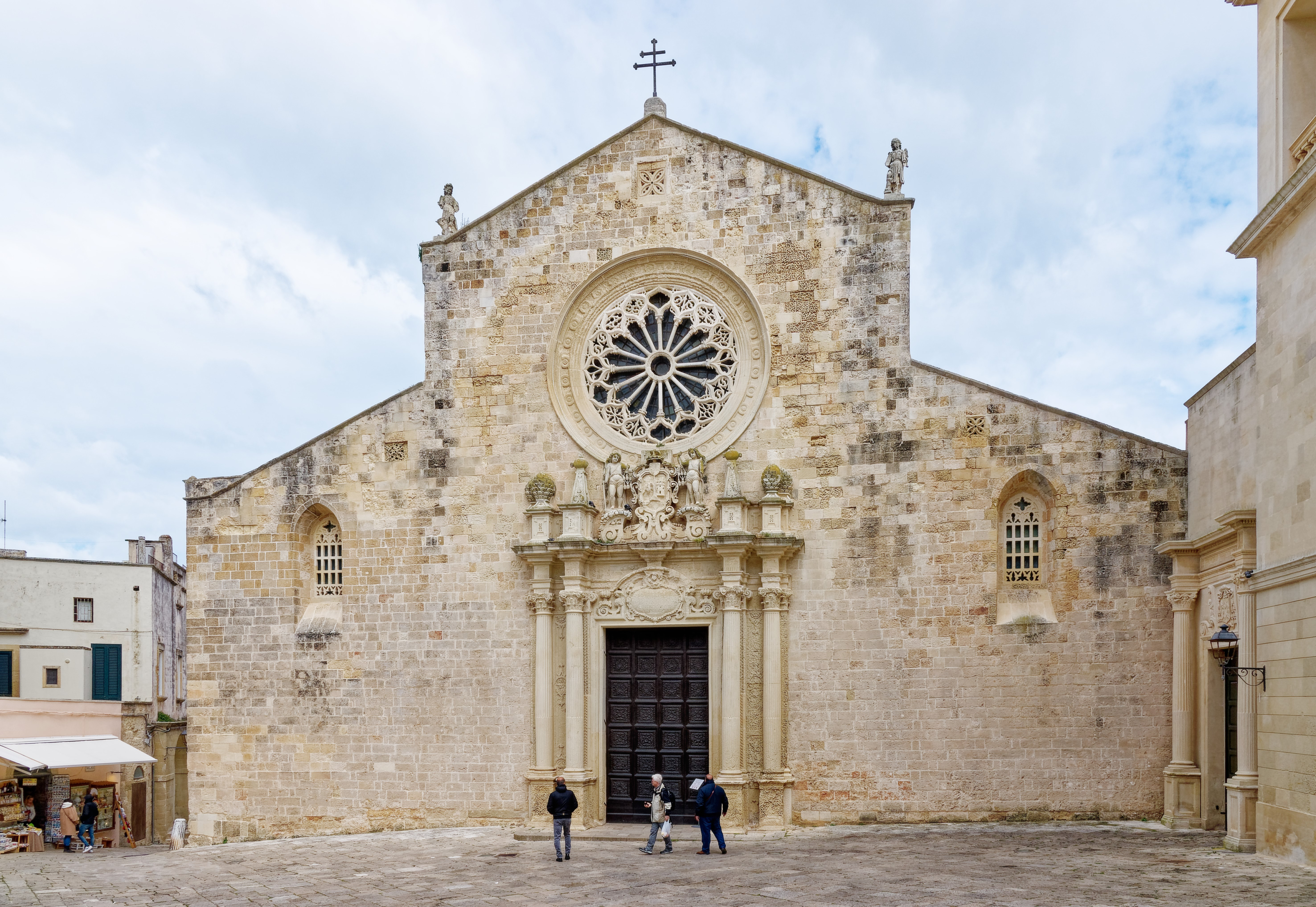
West front of the cathedral.

Otranto Cathedral (Italian: Duomo di Otranto; Basilica Cattedrale di Santa Maria Annunziata) is a Roman Catholic cathedral in the Italian city of Otranto, dedicated to the Annunciation of the Virgin Mary. It is the archiepiscopal seat of the Archdiocese of Otranto. The cathedral was consecrated in 1088. It is 54 metres long by 25 metres wide and is built on 42 monolithic granite and marble columns from unknown quarries. Its plan is a three-aisled nave with an apsidal east end. On either side of the west façade are two lancet windows.

The most famous feature of the cathedral is the 12th-century floor mosaic covering the entire floor of the nave, the sanctuary and the apse, which is one of the best to survive.

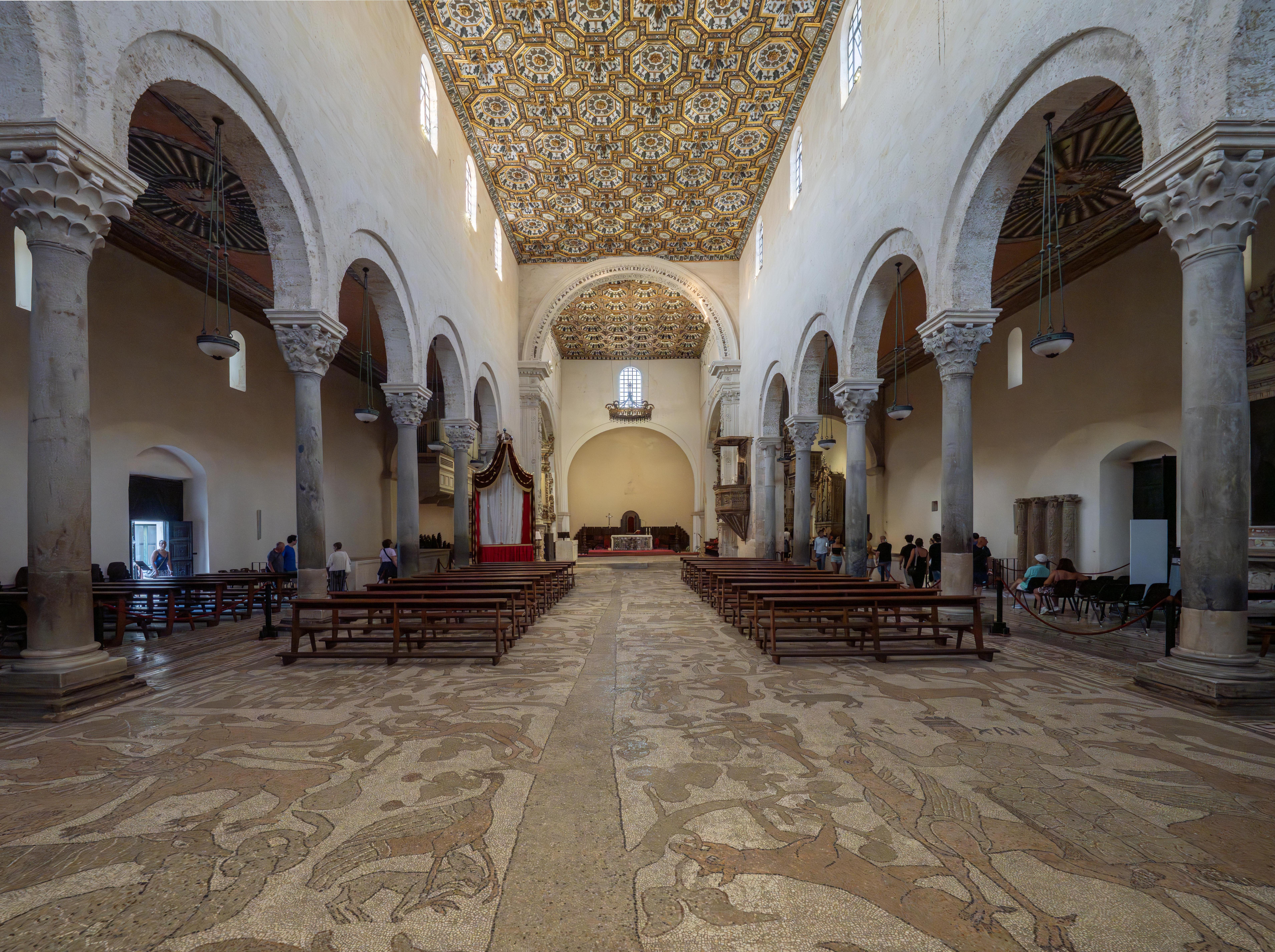
View of the mosaic floor.

== History ==
=== Foundation ===
Built on the remains of a Messapiic village, a Roman house and an early Christian church or temple, the cathedral was founded in 1068 by the Norman bishop William. It is a synthesis of various architectural styles, with Byzantine, early Christian and Romanesque elements. It was consecrated on 1 August 1088 under the papacy of pope Urban II by the papal legate Roffredo, archbishop of Benevento.

=== 12th century ===
The mosaic running the whole length of the nave, sanctuary and apse is 12th century in date – it was commissioned by the first Latin archbishop of the city, Gionata.

The bell tower next to the cathedral was also built in the 12th century.

=== 15th century ===
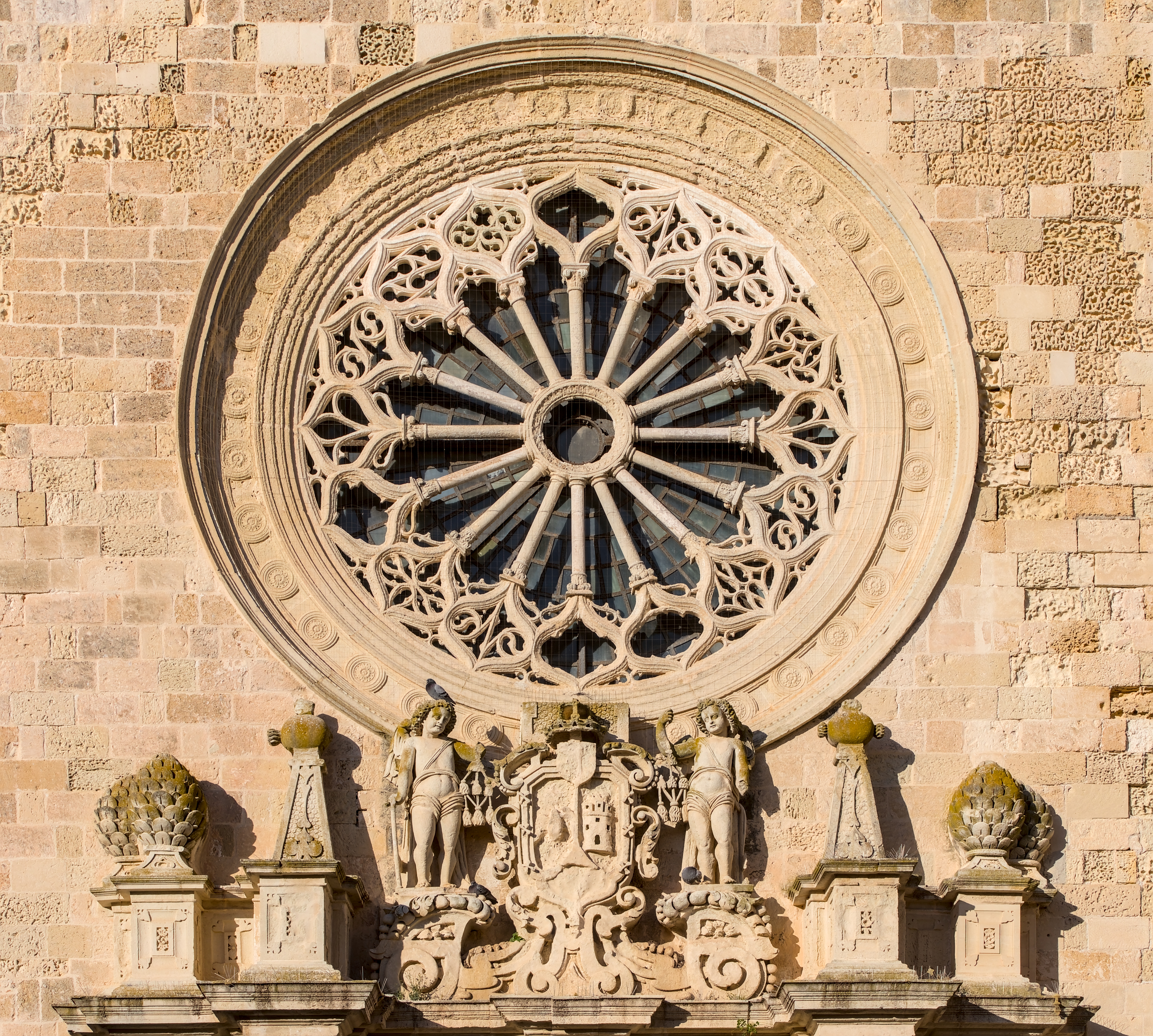
Rose window.

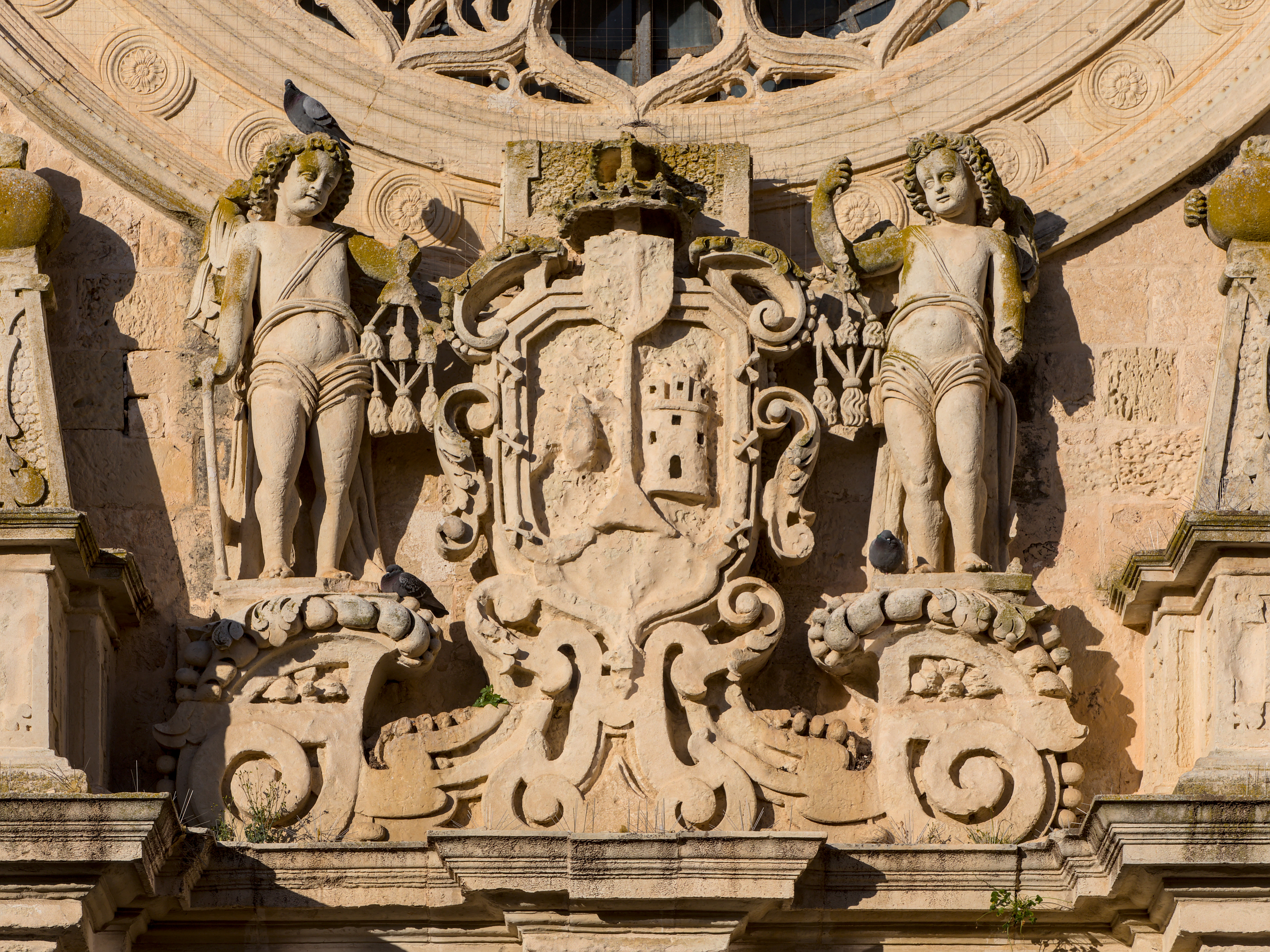
Coat of arms of the city, between two cherubs, below the rose window.

In August 1480, clergy and survivors of the Ottoman siege of Otranto took refuge in the cathedral – the Ottoman force eventually broke in and killed those inside. They then turned the church into a mosque and destroyed its 13th-century frescoes. After Otranto was retaken in 1481 by a force under Alfonso V of Aragon it was turned back into a church and heavily rebuilt to house the relics of the Martyrs of Otranto, who had been executed after the 1480 siege. The reconstruction included the rose window on the gabled west front. In the south aisle is the Chapel of the Martyrs, built by order of Ferdinand I of Naples and rebuilt at public expense in 1711.

=== 16th century to present ===
A north-west door was built in the late 15th or early 16th century by Nicholas Fernando on the instructions of archbishop Serafino da Squillace, whose figure was carved on the structure. In 1674 a Baroque west door was added. In the north aisle is a Baroque baptistery commissioned by archbishop Michele Orsi in the mid 18th century, a burial monument to Francesco Maria de Aste (died 1719) and the mausoleum of the metropolitan Gaetano Cosso (died 1655). In 1693 archbishop Francesco Maria De Aste built the triumphal arch and in 1698 covered the central nave and the sanctuary with a black, white and gilded wooden ceiling.

== Description ==
=== Exterior ===
The hut-shaped façade was restored numerous times during the past centuries. After the ravages of the Turkish occupation in 1480, a large rose window was added: this includes 16 rays with Gothic/Arabic-style, convergent holes. The Baroque-style main portal consists of two half-fluted columns on either side holding up the pediment, with the coat of arms of Archbishop Gabriel de Santander Adarzo supported by two angels. A minor portal, dating to the later 15th-early 16th centuries, is located on the left side of the church.

The façade is completed by two single mullioned windows.

=== Interior ===
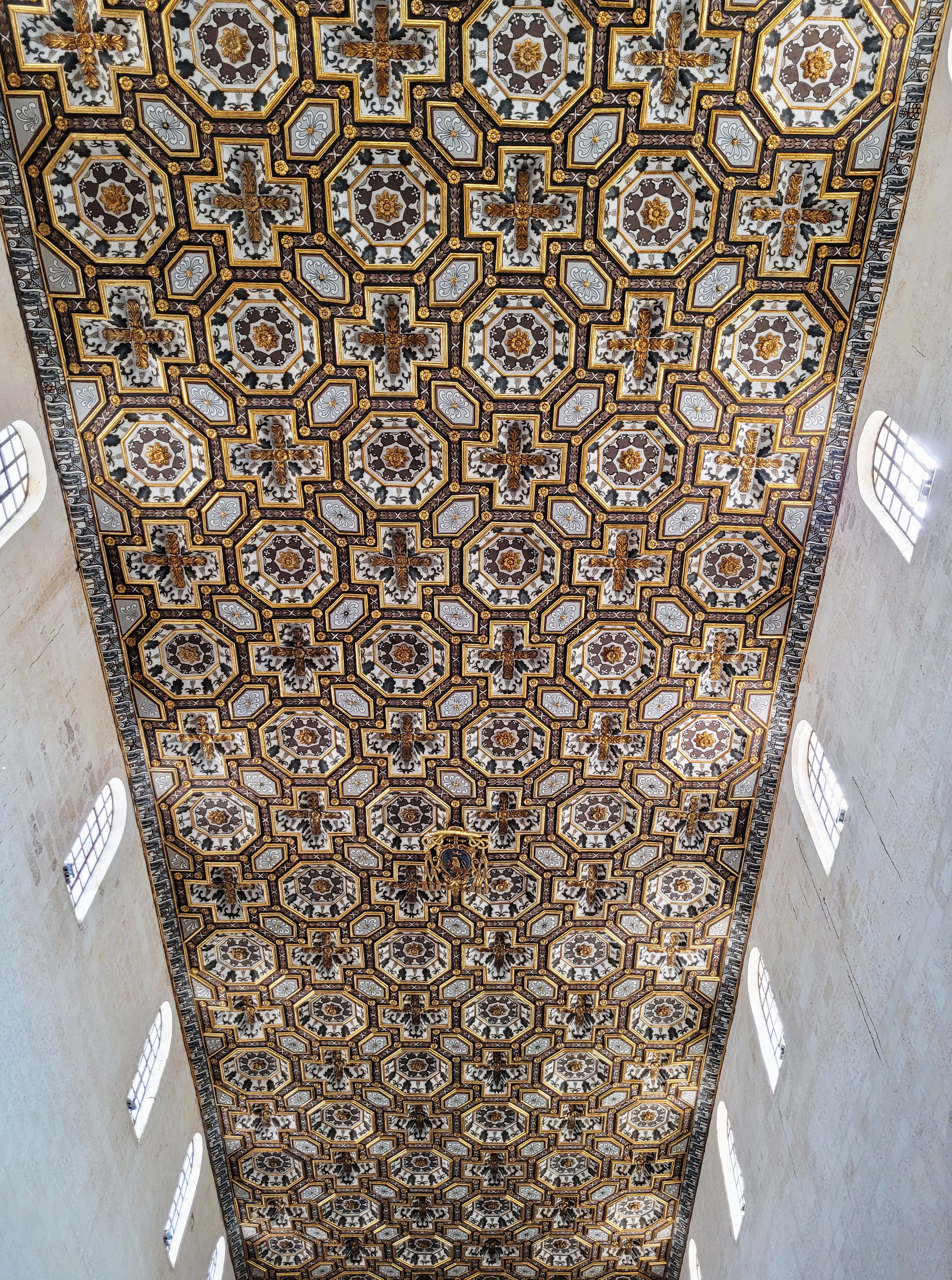
Ceiling of the Cathedral nave; the presbytery ceiling is similar.

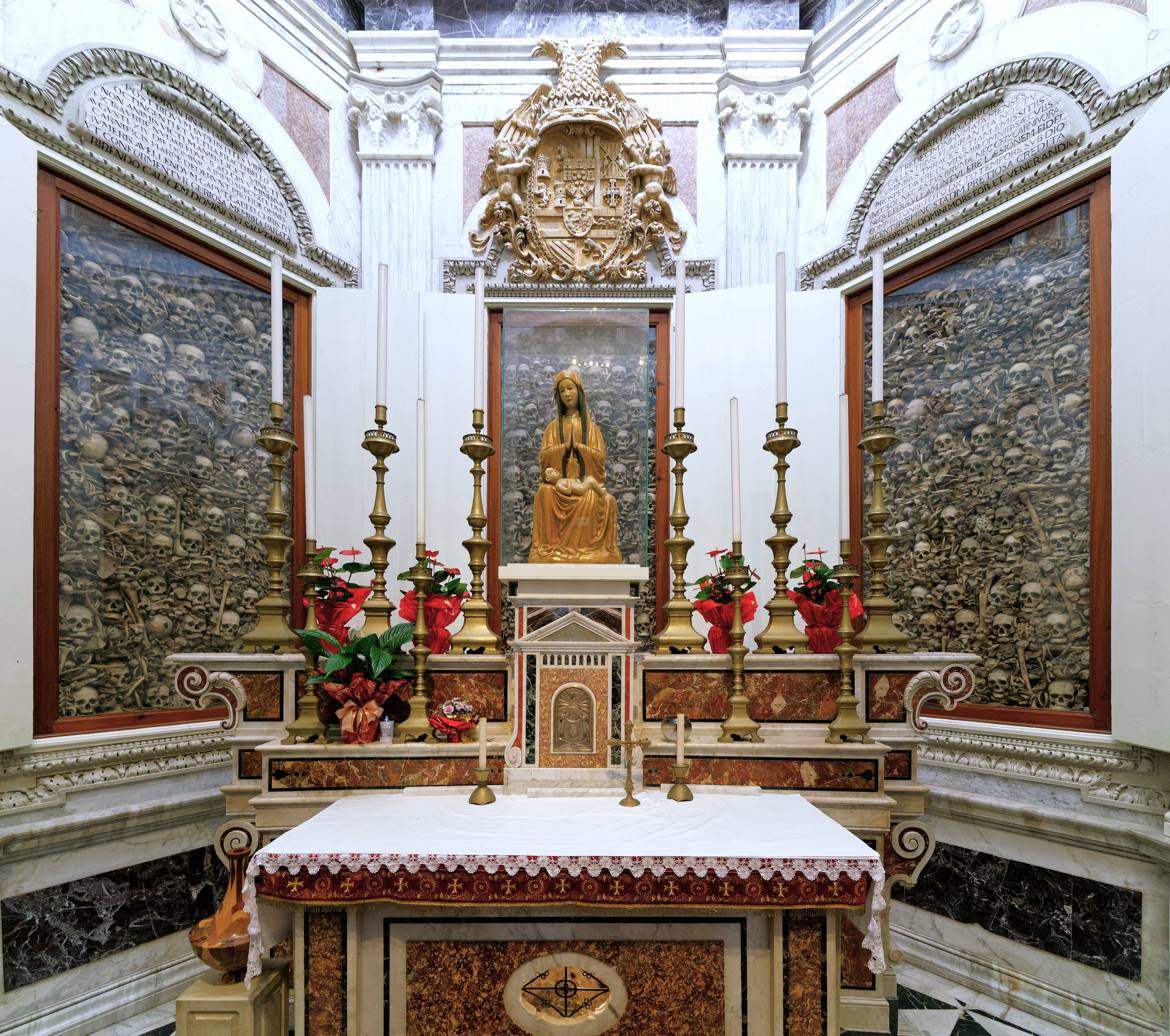
Chapel of the Martyrs.

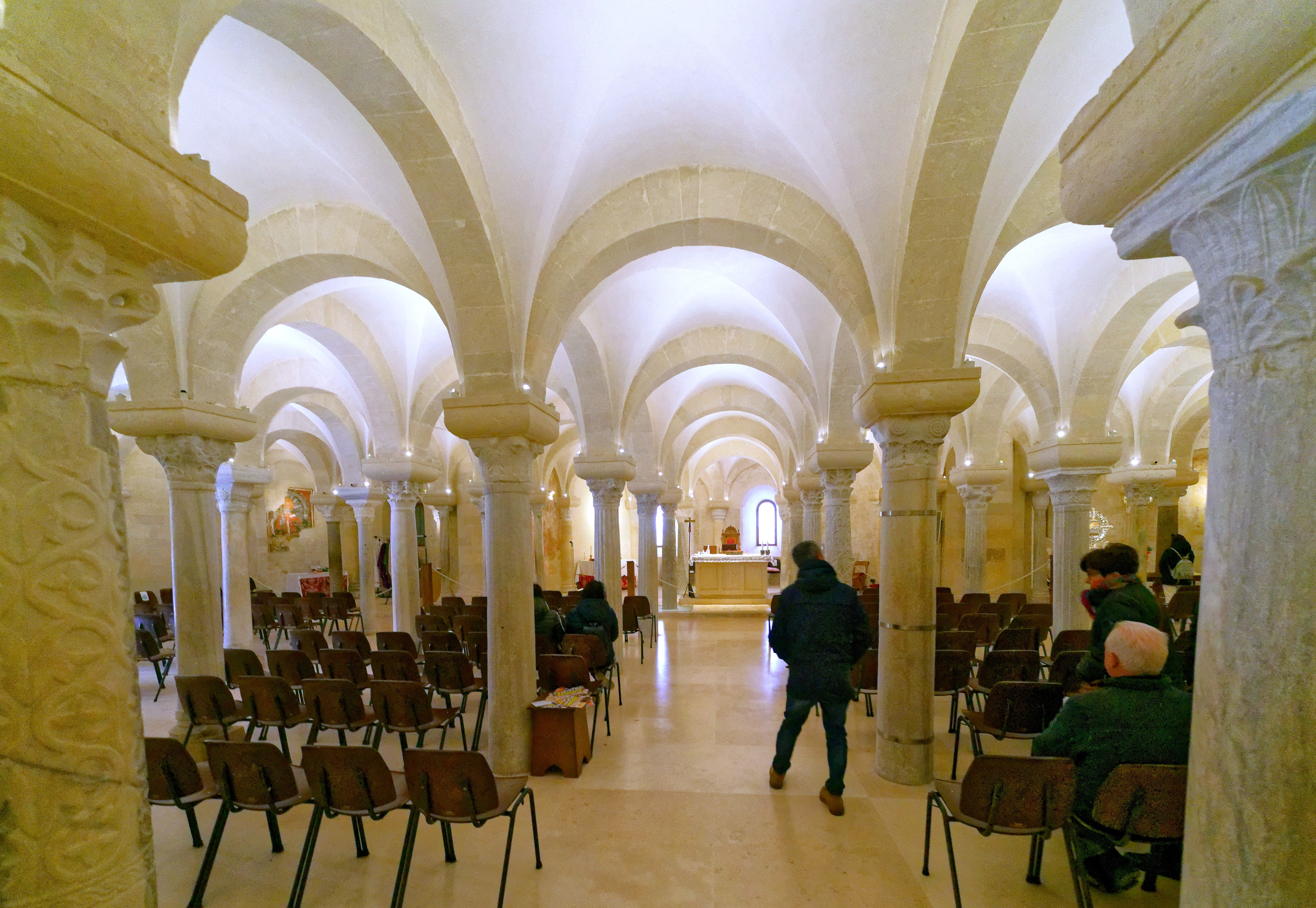
View of the crypt.

The interior plan has a nave and two aisles with apses, separated by twelve arches, which are supported by fourteen granite columns each with a different capital

The high altar is in the presbytery area, with an 18th-century silver antependium, with episodes of the Annunciation of Mary.

The remaining frescoes on the walls include traces of Byzantine-style figures, such as the Madonna with Child in the right aisle. The aisles house six altars dedicated to the Resurrection of Jesus, St. Dominic, Assumption of Mary (right), the Pentecost, the Visitation of Mary and St. Anthony of Padua (left), respectively. The left aisle is also home to a Baroque-style baptistery from the mid-18th century, a funerary monument to Francesco Maria de Aste (died 1719) and the mausoleum of Gaetano Cosso (died 1655).

The right aisle ends with the Chapel of the Martyrs. It houses, in seven large glassed recesses, the bones of the Otranto citizens slaughtered and beheaded by the Ottomans on 14 August 1480 after they had refused to abandon the Christian faith. Behind the marble altar is the alleged "Martyrdom Rock", a stone where, according to the tradition, the eight hundred people were killed.

The crypt, mostly located under the apse and the presbytery, dates from the 11th century and is inspired by the Theodosius Cistern and the Mosque–Cathedral of Córdoba. It has three semi-circular apses and forty-eight bays supported by more than seventy columns, semicolumns and pillars taken from different ancient and medieval buildings. The decoration includes remains of frescoes dating from the Middle Ages through the 16th century.

=== Pavement mosaics ===
The interior is decorated with a large pavement mosaic, which covers the nave, the aisles, the presbytery and the apse. It was commissioned by the first Latin archbishop of the city, Jonatas, and was executed in 1163-1165 by a group of artists headed by Pantaleon, a basilian monk from the monastery of San Nicola di Casole, located a few kilometers south of Otranto.

The scenes include episodes from the Old Testament, the medieval chivalry literature and bestiaries, and the Alexander Romance. The images are placed alongside the Tree of Life. They also include Alexander's flight to heaven, carried by two griffins (see below).

Details of the mosaics

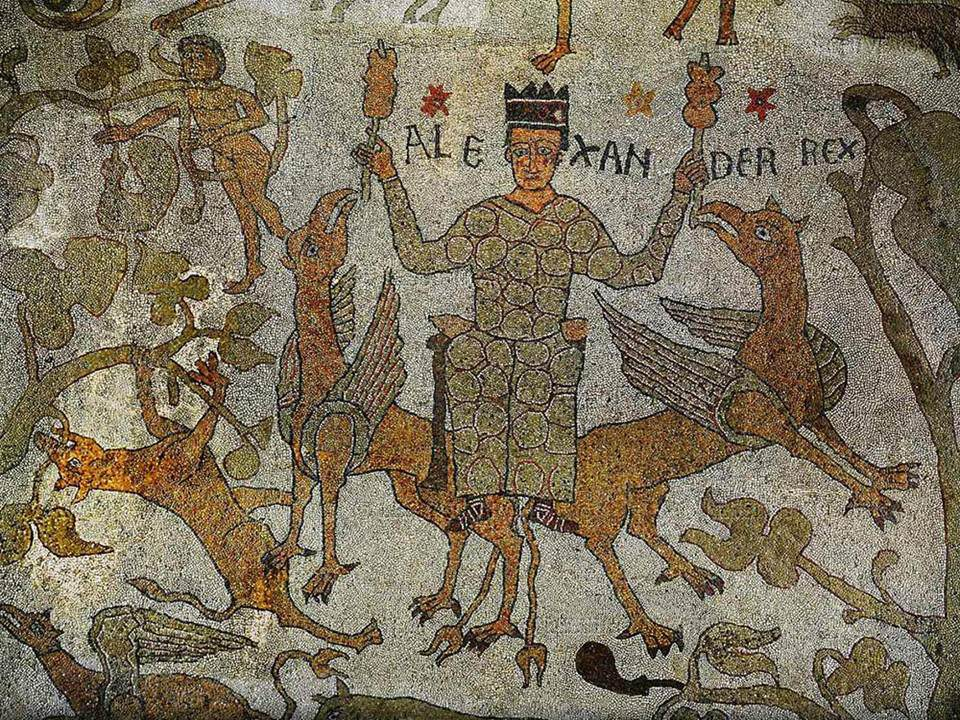
Alexander the Great's flight.

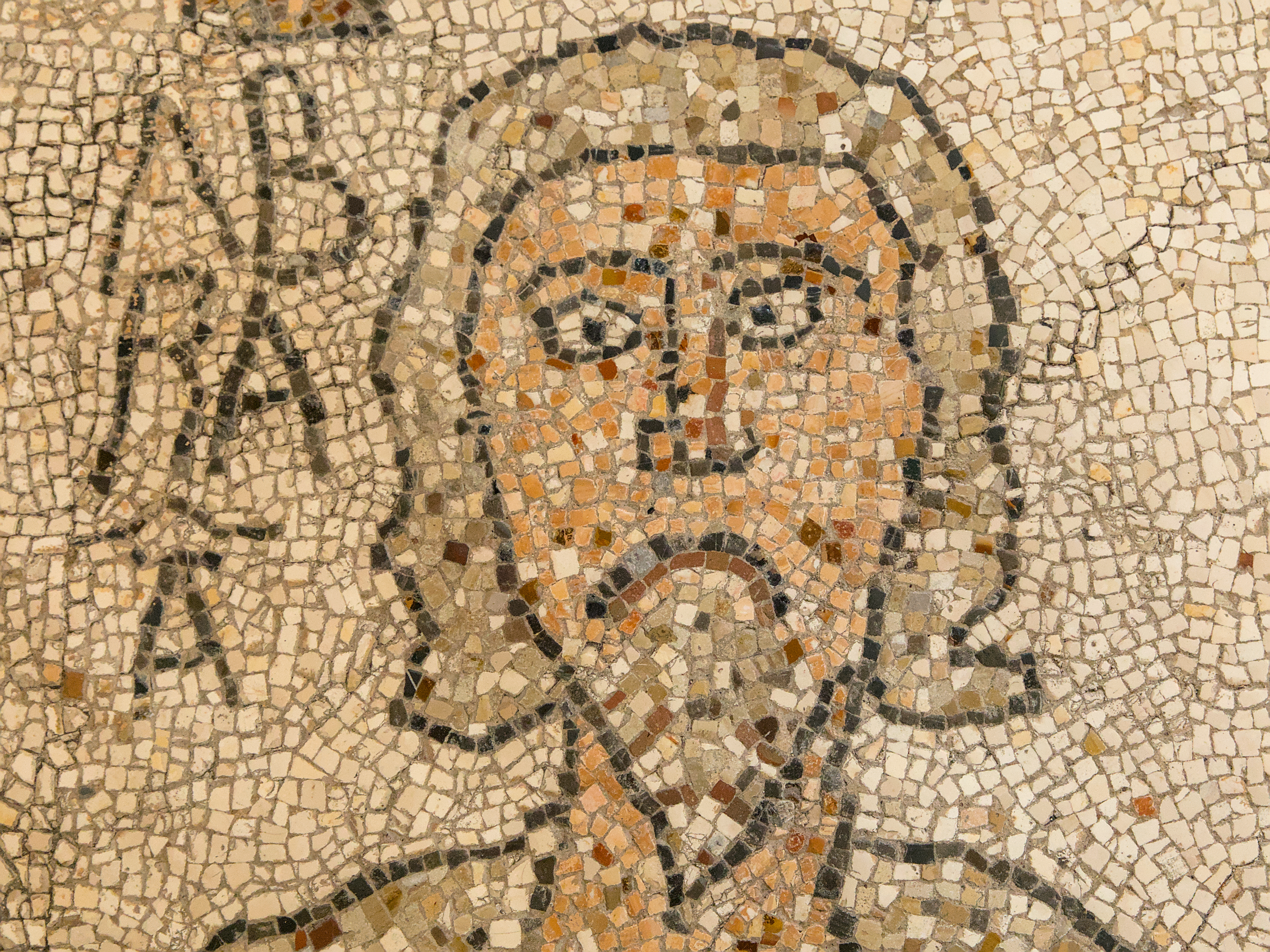
Abraham.

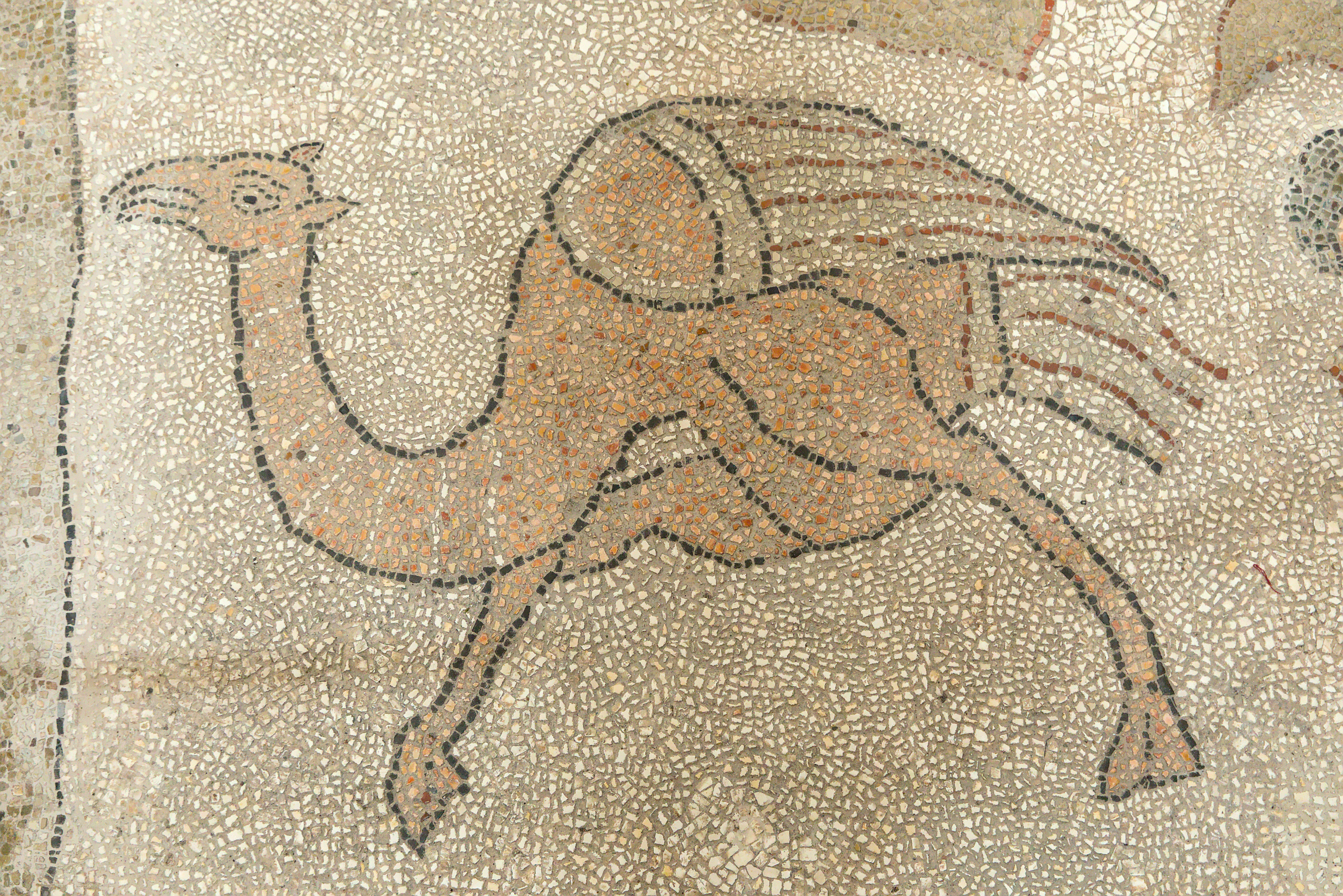
A fantastic animal.

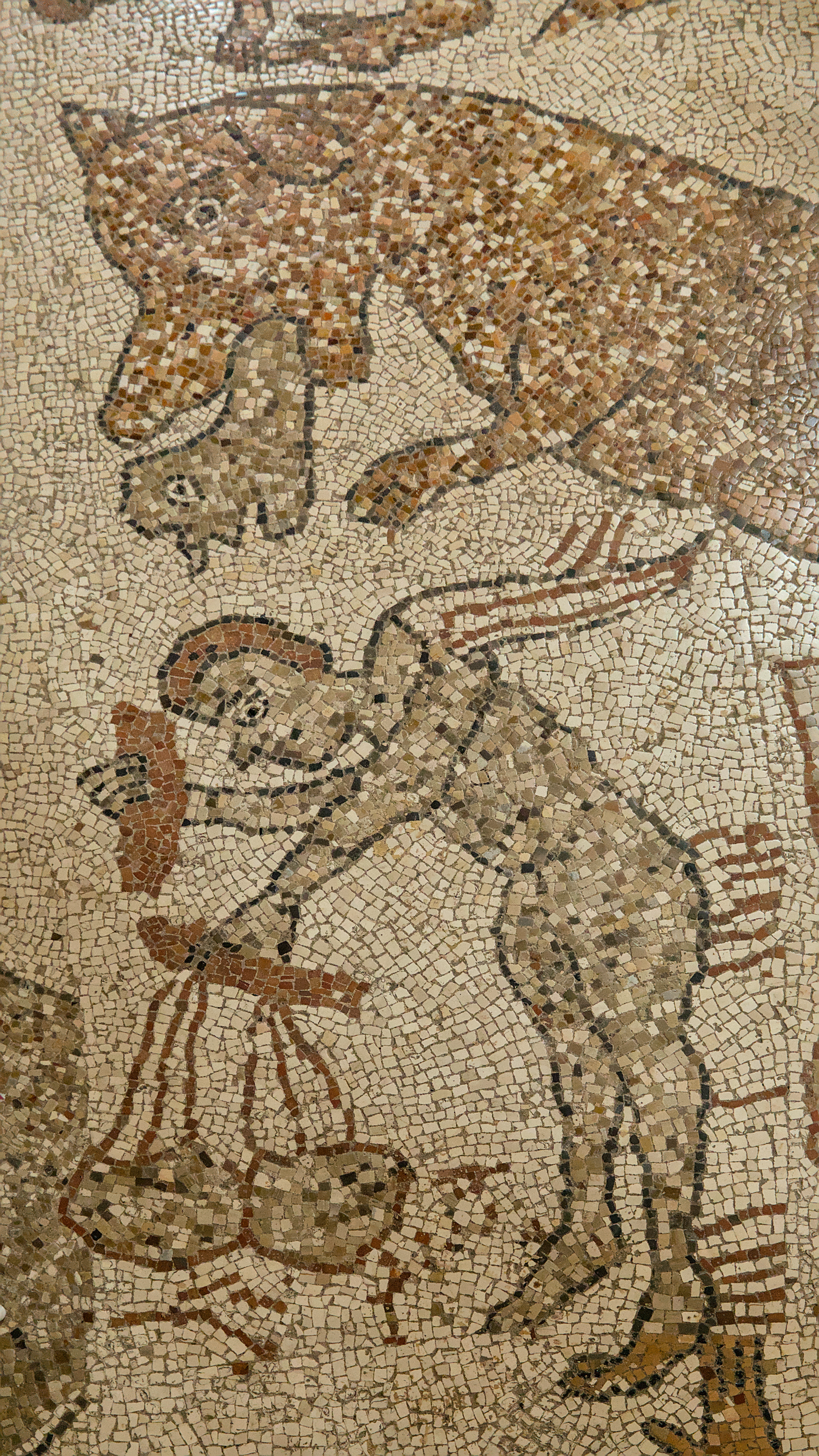
An angel weighs the sins of the damned, and above him, a demon.

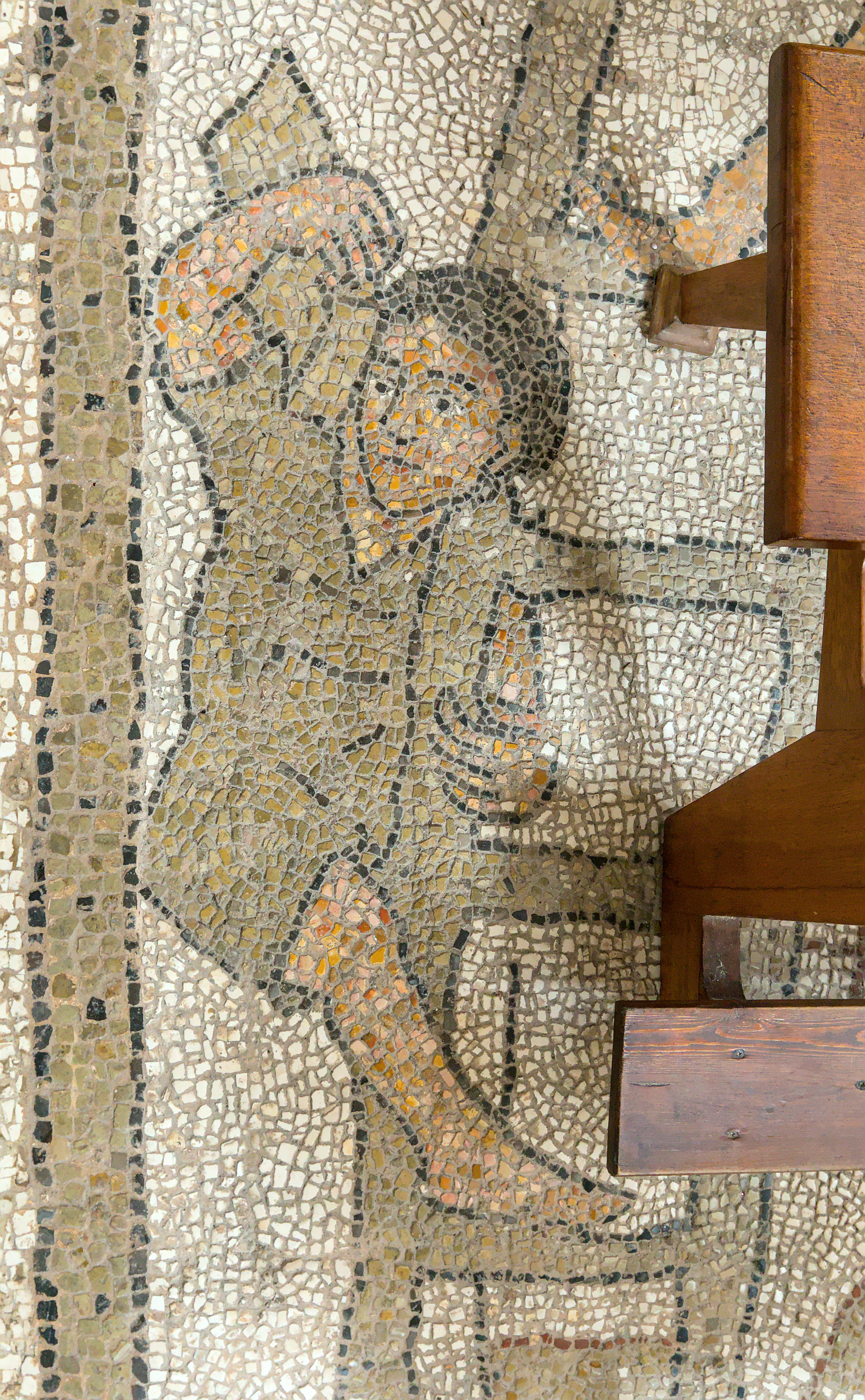
A boy climbs a ladder as part of the construction of the tower of Babel.

==== Flying Alexander ====
A medieval legend in the Alexander romance had Alexander, wishing to see the whole world, first descending into the depths of the ocean in a sort of diving bell, then wanting to see the view from above. To do this he harnessed two large birds, or griffins in other versions, with a seat for him between them. To entice them to keep flying higher he placed meat on two skewers which he held above their heads. This was quite commonly depicted in several medieval cultures, from Europe to Persia, where it may reflect earlier legends or iconographies. Sometimes the beasts are not shown, just the king holding two sticks with flower-like blobs at their ends. The scene is shown in the 12th-century floor mosaic of the Cathedral, with a titulus of "ALEXANDER REX".

=== Bell tower ===
The large bell tower has a square plan and a sturdy appearance, with four rounded windows. The decoration of the arches and frames show similar elements of the exterior of the church.

The tower, built in mostly white, local variants of limestone, was likely the support of a taller structure, which overwatched the sea and the surrounding areas.

== Sources ==
- Gianfreda, Grazio (2002). La Cattedrale di Otranto celebra il Signore. Edizioni del Grifo.
- Russo, Fernando (2003). Trame d'oro. Cassettonato della Cattedrale di Otranto. Documentazioni e suggestioni di un restauro. Edizioni Romanae.
- Barba, Giovanni (2005). L'opera ingenua. Una nuova lettura del mosaico pavimentale della cattedrale di Otranto. Edizioni del Grifo.
