= Roman Catholic Diocese of Carinola =

The Diocese of Caorle or Diocese of Calina (Latin: Dioecesis Caprulana seu Caprularum) was a Roman Catholic ecclesiastical territory in the town of Carinola in the Province of Caserta in the Italian region Campania. It was suppressed in 1818 to the Diocese of Sessa Aurunca.

== History ==
1099: Erected as the Diocese of Carinola
1818 June 27: Suppressed to the Diocese of Sessa Aurunca
1968: Restored as the Titular Episcopal See of Carinola

== Ordinaries ==
- Pedro Gamboa (1501 Succeeded - 18 Nov 1510 Died)
- Giovanni Antonio Orfei (18 Nov 1510 Appointed - 1518 Died)
- Giovanni Francesco D'Anna (10 Nov 1518 Appointed - 1521 Resigned)
- Ferdinando D'Anna (16 Oct 1521 Appointed - 21 Oct 1530 Appointed, Archbishop of Amalfi)
- Juan Canuti (21 Oct 1530 Appointed - 15 Jan 1535 Appointed, Bishop of Cariati e Cerenzia)
- Taddeo Pepoli, O.S.B. (15 Jan 1535 Appointed - 1549 Died)
- Bartolomeo Capranica (9 Apr 1549 Appointed - 1572 Died)
- Sisto Diuzioli (2 Jun 1572 Appointed - 1577 Died)
- Meliaduce Suico (14 Aug 1577 Appointed - 1581 Died)
- Nicola Antonio Vitelli (11 Sep 1581 Appointed - 1594 Died)
- Giovanni Vitelli, C.R. (1594 Succeeded - 14 Dec 1609 Appointed, Bishop of Capaccio)
- Archangelus de Rossi, C.R.L. (11 Jan 1610 Appointed - 1619 Died)
- Alessandro Bosco (20 Nov 1619 Appointed - 8 Aug 1622 Appointed, Bishop of Gerace)
- Antonio Bonfiglioli (19 Sep 1622 Appointed - 1624 Resigned)
- Onufrius Sersagli (7 Oct 1624 Appointed - 1640 Died)
- Vencent Cavaselice (13 Aug 1640 Appointed - 1664 Died)
- Paolo Airolo, C.R.M. (9 Jun 1664 Appointed - Sep 1702 Died)
- Alphonsus del Balzo (15 Jan 1703 Appointed - Sep 1705 Died)
- Antonio della Marra, C.R. (25 Jan 1706 Appointed - 13 May 1714 Died)
- Domenico Antonio Cirillo (10 Jan 1718 Appointed - 14 Feb 1724 Appointed, Bishop of Teano)
- Nicola Michele Abati (Abbate) (26 Jun 1724 Appointed - 28 Sep 1733 Appointed, Bishop of Squillace)
- Hyacinthus Verdesca (1 Oct 1733 Appointed - Sep 1747 Died)
- Giovanni Bufalini (18 Dec 1747 Appointed - 28 Nov 1748 Died)
- Antonio Francesco de Plato (3 Mar 1749 Appointed - 3 Mar 1760 Appointed, Bishop of Tricarico)
- Francesco Antonio Salomone (3 Mar 1760 Appointed - 16 May 1766 Died)
- Thomas Zarone (21 Jul 1766 Appointed - Aug 1791 Died)
- Giovanni Gaetano del Muscio, Sch. P. (26 Mar 1792 Confirmed - 18 Dec 1797 Confirmed, Bishop of San Severo)
- Salvatore de Lucia (18 Dec 1797 Confirmed - )

== See also ==
- Catholic Church in Italy
