= Archdiocese of Otranto =

Catholic archdiocese in Italy

Coordinates: 40.1500°N 18.4833°E

Archdiocese of Otranto Archidioecesis Hydruntina Arcidiocesi di Otranto

Catholic
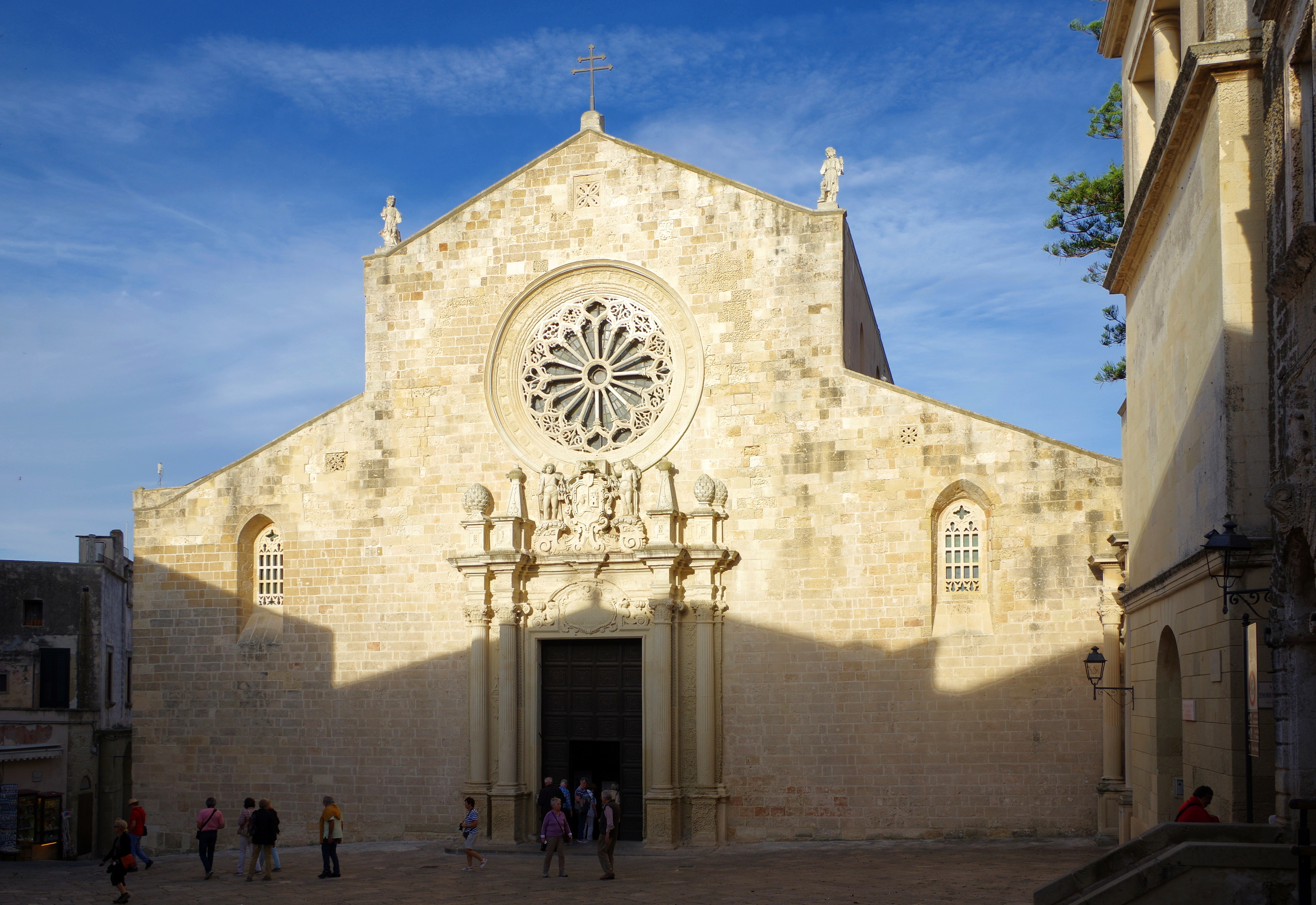
- Otranto Cathedral

Location
- Country: Italy
- Ecclesiastical province: Lecce

Statistics
- Area: 800 km^{2} (310 sq mi)
- Population: Total; Catholics: (as of 2023); 187,200 ▼; 184,300 ▼ (98.5%)
- Parishes: 80

Information
- Denomination: Catholic
- Sui iuris church: Latin Church
- Rite: Roman Rite
- Established: 11th Century
- Cathedral: Cattedrale di Maria SS. Annunziata
- Secular priests: 94 (diocesan) ▼21 (Religious Orders) ▼4 Permanent Deacons ▼

Current leadership
- Pope: Leo XIV
- Archbishop: Donato Negro

Website
- diocesiotranto.it

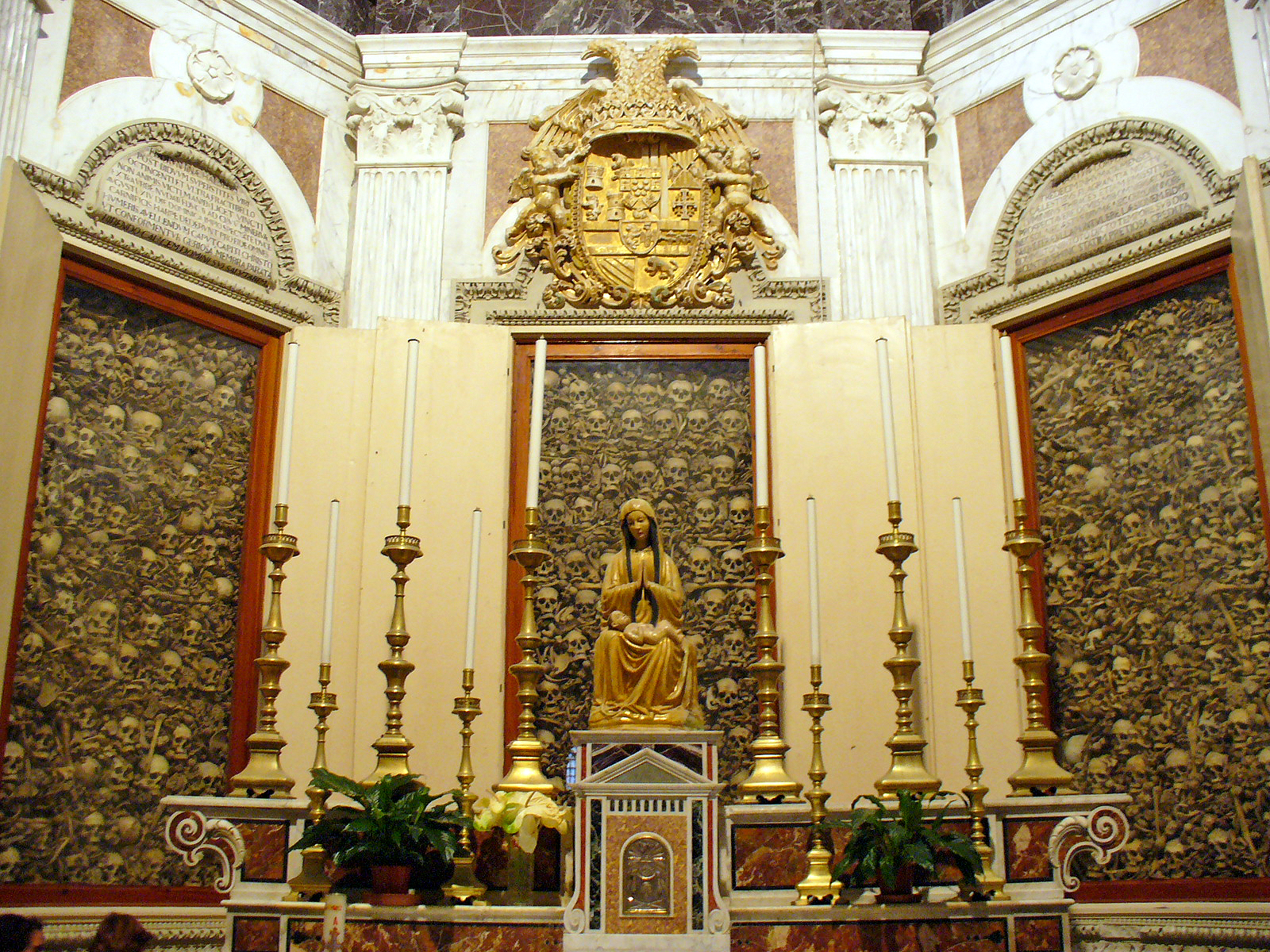
Inside Otranto cathedral.

The Archdiocese of Otranto (Latin: Archidioecesis Hydruntina) is a Latin archdiocese of the Catholic Church in Italy. The seat of the diocese is at Otranto Cathedral in the city of Otranto, Apulia. It is a suffragan of the archdiocese of Lecce.

The current archbishop is Donato Negro.

== History ==
The first known bishop was Petrus, to whom St. Gregory the Great refers in 596. His two alleged successors, Sabinus (599) and Petrus (601), were the invention of Ferdinando Ughelli, who mistakenly believed that Sabinus was Bishop of Otranto, whereas he was in fact Bishop of Gallipoli.

The bishop of Hydruntum (Otranto) already appears as a subject of the Patriarch of Constantinople in the Notitia Dignitatum in the time of the Emperor Leo VI (886–912). Bishop Marcus (about 870) is believed to be the author of the Greek liturgical office for Holy Saturday.

Bishop Petrus of Hydruntum (968) was raised to the dignity of Metropolitan by Polyeuctus, Patriarch of Constantinople (956-70), with the obligation to establish the Byzantine Rite throughout the new ecclesiastical province, and the authority to consecrate bishops in the churches of Acerenza, Tursi, Gravina, Matera, and Tricarico, all previously dependent on the Church of Rome. The Latin Church was introduced again after the Norman conquest, but the Byzantine Rite remained in use in several towns of the archdiocese and of its suffragans, until the sixteenth century.

In 1818, a new concordat with the Kingdom of the Two Sicilies committed the pope to the suppression of more than fifty small dioceses in the kingdom. In the ecclesiastical province of Otranto, the diocese of Castro, formerly a suffragan of Otranto, was suppressed by Pope Pius VII in the bull "De Utiliori" of 27 June 1818, and its territory incorporated into the diocese of Otranto. The diocese of Alessano was likewise suppressed, and its territory incorporated into the diocese of Ugento. In the same concordat, the King acquired the right to nominate candidates for vacant bishoprics. That situation persisted down until the final overthrow of the Bourbon monarchy in 1860.

As the Metropolitan of the ecclesiastical province, Otranto had as suffragans (subordinates) Gallipoli, Ugento, and Lecce. On 28 September 1960, however, Pope John XXIII, with the bull "Cum a nobis", separated the diocese of Lecce from the ecclesiastical province of Otranto and made it immediately subject to the Holy See.

=== Cathedral and Chapter ===
The cathedral, dedicated to the taking up (assumption) of the body of the Virgin Mary into heaven, was consecrated in August 1088, by Archbishop Roffredo of Benevento, the Papal Legate, assisted by Archbishop Urso of Bari, Archbishop Alberto of Taranto, Archbishop Godino of Brindisi, with the attendance of Duke Roger of Apulia.

The cathedral of Otranto was administered by a Chapter, composed of twenty-four Canons. Among them were the dignities of the Archdeacon, the Cantor, the Dean, the Capellanus major, the Treasurer, the Primicerius, and the Penitentiary.

=== Synods ===
A provincial synod was a meeting of a metropolitan archbishop with his suffragan bishops, and any other persons whom he wished to invite, such as representatives of cathedral Chapters, abbots of important monasteries, and canon lawyers. Canons were framed or reauthorized, and decrees of the Roman Curia were promulgated. Matters of ecclesiastical discipline were dealt with. A provincial synod was held in Otranto in September 1567 by Archbishop Pietro de Capua.

A diocesan synod was an irregularly held, but important, meeting of the bishop of a diocese and his clergy. Its purpose was (1) to proclaim generally the various decrees already issued by the bishop; (2) to discuss and ratify measures on which the bishop chose to consult with his clergy; (3) to publish statutes and decrees of the diocesan synod, of the provincial synod, and of the Holy See.

On 18–20 October 1641, Bishop Gaetano Cossa (1635-1657) held a diocesan synod. Bishop Ambrogio Piccolomini (1675–1682) held a diocesan synod in 1679.

Bishop Andrea Mansi (1818–1832) held ten diocesan synods.

=== Loss of metropolitanate ===
Following the Second Vatican Council, and in accordance with the norms laid out in the Council's decree, Christus Dominus chapter 40, the Episcopal Conference of Apulia petitioned the Holy See (Pope) that Lecce be made a metropolitan and that a new ecclesiastical province be created. After wide consultations among all affected parties, Pope John Paul II issued a decree on 20 October 1980, elevating Lecce to the status of metropolitan see. He also created the new ecclesiastical province of Lecce, whose constituent bishoprics (suffragans) were to be: Brindisi (no longer a metropolitanate, though the archbishop allowed to retain the title of archbishop), Otranto (no longer a metropolitanate, though the archbishop allowed to retain the title of archbishop), Gallipoli, Nardò, Ostuno, and Uxentina-S. Mariae Leucadensis (Ugento).

The archdiocese, in 2019, has seven seminarians enrolled in the major seminary and seven students in the minor seminary.

== Bishops and (from 1088) Archbishops ==
=== to 1200 ===
...
[Benedictus] (c. 431)
...

- Petrus (attested 595, 599, 601)

...

- Andreas (attested 649)
- Joannes (attested 680)

...

- Marcus (c. 870)

...

- Hypatius (attested 1054)

...

- Hugo (attested 1067, 1071)

...

- Berardus (attested 1090, 1101)
- Jonathas (attested 1163–1179)
- Guillelmus (attested 1189–1200)

=== 1200 to 1500 ===
- Anonymous (attested 1203)
- Anonymous (attested 1215–1218)
- Tancredus (1219–1235)

Sede vacante (attested in 1239)

- Jucundus (c. 1240)
- Matthaeus de Castellione de Palma (1253–1282)
- Jacobus (1283–1309)
- Thomasius (1310–1320)
- Lucas, O.P. (1321–1329)
- Orso Minutulo (1329–1330)
- Joannes, O.P. (1330–1345)
- Reginaldus (12 December 1345 -1351)
- Filippo di Lanzano (20 May 1351 - 1363)
- Jacobus de Itri (1363-1376)

Jacobus de Itri (1376–1378) Administrator

- Guilelmus, O.Min. (1379–1393) Administrator
- Tirellus (1380–1382) (Roman Obedience)
- Petrus (1382–1389) (Roman Obedience)
- Joannes (1390–1395?) (Roman Obedience)
- Riccardus (1393– ? ) (Avignon Obedience)
- Philippus (1395–1417) (Roman Obedience)
- Aragonio Malaspina (1418–1424)
- Nicolaus Pagani (1424–1451)
- Stephanus Pentinelli (1451–1480)
- Serafino da Squillace, O.Min. (1480–1514)

=== 1500 to 1800 ===
- Fabrizio di Capua (1514–1526)

Cardinal Alessandro Cesarini (1526–1536) Administrator

- Pietro Antonio Di Capua (1536-1579)
- Pedro Corderos (1579-1585)
- Marcello Acquaviva (1587-1606)
- Lucius de Morra (1606–1623)
- Giovanni (Diego) Lopez de Andrade, O.S.A. (1623-1628)

Sede vacante (1628–1635)

Fabrizio degli Antinori (1630-1630)

- Gaetano Cossa, C.R. (1635-1657)
- Gabriel de Santander (1657–1674)
- Ambrosius Maria Piccolomini (1675–c.1682)
- Ferdinando de Aguiar y Saavedra (1684–1689)
- Francesco Maria d'Aste (1690–1719)

Sede vacante (1719–1722)

- Michele Orsi (1722–1752)
- Marcello Papiniano Cusani (1753–1754)
- Nicolaus Caracciolo, O.Theat. (1754–1766)
- Giulio Pignatelli (1767–1784)

Sede vacante (1784–1792)

- Vincenzo Maria Morelli (1792–1812)

=== since 1800 ===
Sede vacante (1812–1818)

- Andrea Mansi, O.F.M. Disc. (1818-1832)
- Vincenzo Andrea Grande (1834-1871)
- Giuseppe Caiazzo, O.E.S.A. (1872-1883)
- Rocco Cocchia, O.F.M. Cap. (9 Aug 1883-1887)
- Salvatore Maria Bressi, O.F.M. Cap. (23 May 1887- 23 Jan 1890)
- Gaetano Caporali, C.Pp.S. (23 Jun 1890- 23 Nov 1911 Died)
- Giuseppe Ridolfi (10 Aug 1912- 12 Aug 1915 Resigned)

Sede vacante (1915–1918)

- Carmelo Patané (11 Jan 1918-1930)
- Cornelio Sebastiano Cuccarollo, O.F.M. Cap. (24 Oct 1930- 10 Jul 1952 Retired)
- Raffaele Calabria (10 Jul 1952-1960)
- Gaetano Pollio, P.I.M.E. (8 Sep 1960-1969)
- Nicola Riezzo (28 Apr 1969- 27 Jan 1981 Retired)
- Vincenzo Franco (27 Jan 1981- 8 Apr 1993 Retired)
- Francesco Cacucci (8 Apr 1993-1999)
- Donato Negro (29 April 2000 – present)

== Bibliography ==
=== Reference for bishops ===
- Gams, Pius Bonifatius (1873). Series episcoporum Ecclesiae catholicae: quotquot innotuerunt a beato Petro apostolo (in Latin). Ratisbon: Typis et Sumptibus Georgii Josephi Manz. pp. 910–911.
- Eubel, Conradus, ed. (1913). Hierarchia catholica (in Latin). Vol. Tomus 1 (second ed.). Münster: Libreria Regensbergiana.
- Eubel, Conradus, ed. (1914). Hierarchia catholica (in Latin). Vol. Tomus 2 (second ed.). Münster: Libreria Regensbergiana.
- Gulik, Guilelmus (1923). Eubel, Conradus (ed.). Hierarchia catholica (in Latin). Vol. Tomus 3 (second ed.). Münster: Libreria Regensbergiana.
- Gauchat, Patritius (Patrice) (1935). Hierarchia catholica (in Latin). Vol. Tomus IV (1592-1667). Münster: Libraria Regensbergiana.
- Ritzler, Remigius; Sefrin, Pirminus (1952). Hierarchia catholica medii et recentis aevi V (1667-1730). Patavii: Messagero di S. Antonio.
- Ritzler, Remigius; Sefrin, Pirminus (1958). Hierarchia catholica medii et recentis aevi (in Latin). Vol. Tomus VI (1730-1799). Patavii: Messagero di S. Antonio.
- Ritzler, Remigius; Sefrin, Pirminus (1968). Hierarchia Catholica medii et recentioris aevi sive summorum pontificum, S. R. E. cardinalium, ecclesiarum antistitum series... A pontificatu Pii PP. VII (1800) usque ad pontificatum Gregorii PP. XVI (1846) (in Latin). Vol. VII. Monasterii: Libr. Regensburgiana.
- Remigius Ritzler; Pirminus Sefrin (1978). Hierarchia catholica Medii et recentioris aevi... A Pontificatu PII PP. IX (1846) usque ad Pontificatum Leonis PP. XIII (1903) (in Latin). Vol. VIII. Il Messaggero di S. Antonio.
- Pięta, Zenon (2002). Hierarchia catholica medii et recentioris aevi... A pontificatu Pii PP. X (1903) usque ad pontificatum Benedictii PP. XV (1922) (in Latin). Vol. IX. Padua: Messagero di San Antonio. ISBN 978-88-250-1000-8.

=== Studies ===
- Cappelletti, Giuseppe (1870). Le chiese d'Italia dalla loro origine sino ai nostri giorni (in Italian). Vol. Tomo vigesimo primo (21). Venezia: G. Antonelli. pp. 297–306.
- Cataldi, Nicola (1848. "Otranto". In: Vincenzo D'Avino, Cenni storici sulle chiese arcivescovili, vescovi, e prelazie (nullius) del Regno delle due Sicilie (Napoli: Ranucci 1848), pp. 519-526. [filled with errors]
- Kamp, Norbert (1975). Kirche und Monarchie im staufischen Königreich Sizilien. I. Prosopographische Grundlegung: 2. Apulien und Kalabrien. München: Wilhelm Fink Verlag. (in German)
- Kehr, Paul Fridolin (1962). Italia pontificia. Vol. IX: Samnium — Apulia — Lucania. Berlin: Weidmann. (in Latin)
- Leverano, Girolamo Marci di (1855). Descrizione, origini, e successi della provincia d'Otranto (in Italian). Napoli: stamperia dell' Iride. pp. 554–561.
- Lanzoni, Francesco (1927). Le diocesi d'Italia dalle origini al principio del secolo VII (an. 604). Faenza: F. Lega, pp. 310, 317. (in Italian)
- Mann, Horace K. (1910). The Lives of the Popes in the Early Middle Ages, Vol. IV: The Popes in the Days of Feudal Anarchy, 891-999.
- Po-Chia Hsia, R. (12 May 2005). The World of Catholic Renewal, 1540-1770. Cambridge University Press. p. 58. ISBN 978-0-521-84154-2.
- Ughelli, Ferdinando; Coleti, Niccolò (1721). Italia sacra sive De episcopis Italiæ, et insularum adjacentium (in Latin). Vol. Tomus nonus (9). Venice: apud Sebastianum Coleti. pp. 51–67.
