= List of republics =

This is a list of republics. For antiquity (or later in the case of societies that did not refer to modern terminology to qualify their form of government) the assessment of whether a state organisation is a republic is based on retrospective analysis by historians and political theorists. For more recent systems of government, worldwide organisations with a broad political acceptance (such as the United Nations), can provide information on whether or not a sovereign state is referred to as a republic.

== List by period ==
=== Antiquity ===
State	Dates of existence (BCE)	Notes
Ancient Carthage	c. 7th/6th century –146	Greek sources may have misunderstood Carthage’s political system, mistaking its leaders for kings when it was actually governed by a council of nobles (Shophets). The legend of Queen Dido likely served to legitimize this non-monarchical system. During the 6th century BC, Carthage experienced political upheaval marked by the revolt of a shophet/general named Malchus, signaling the city’s transition from monarchy to an oligarchic republic. Inscriptions from this period suggest that aristocratic rule had become firmly established by the late 7th or mid 6th century BC.
Mahajanapadas	c. 7th/6th century – c. 345	Sixteen kingdoms or oligarchic republics that existed in ancient India from the sixth to fourth centuries BCE, during the second urbanisation period.
Licchavikas	c. 7th/6th century – c. 468	The leading confederate tribe of the Vajjika League Mahajanapada; the city of Vesālī was the republic's capital.
Vaidehas	c. 7th/6th century – c. 468	One of the confederate tribes of the Vajjika League Mahajanapada; the city of Mithilā was the republic's capital.
Nāyas	c. 7th/6th century – c. 468	One of the confederate tribes of the Vajjika League Mahajanapada; the city of Kuṇḍagāma was the republic's capital.
Mallakas	c. 7th/6th century – c. 468	One of the confederate tribes of the Vajjika League Mahajanapada; the Mallakas were divided into two republics with the cities of Kusinārā and Pāvā as their respective capitals.
Sakyas	c. 7th/6th century – c. 5th century	
Koliyas	c. 7th/6th century – c. 5th century	
Moriyas	c. 7th/6th century – c. 5th century	
Bulayas	c. 7th/6th century – c. 5th century	
Bhaggas	c. 7th/6th century – c. 5th/4th century	
Kālāmas	c. 7th/6th century – c. 5th/4th century	
Roman Republic	509–27	
Classical Athens	508–322	Various Greek city-states under Classical Athenian influence; these loyalties and governments changed frequently (see synoecisms), and in some instances were even under the influence of Sparta without succumbing to oligarchy.

=== Middle Ages ===
State	Dates of existence (CE)	System of government
Khersonite State	422 BCE – 1299 CE	Democracy
Republic of San Marino	since 301, constitutional since 1600	Directorial Republic
Monemvasía State	588–1252	
Qarmatians	899–1067	Theocracy
Gotland	?–1285	Thing (Assembly)
Frisian freedom(Upstalsboom League),	c. 12th century–15th century	peasant republic
Icelandic Commonwealth	930–1262	
Couto Misto	c. 1000 – 1868	
Taifa of Córdoba	1031–1070	
Republic of Florence	1115–1537	
Republic of Siena	1125–1557	
Novgorod Republic	1136–1478	
Commune of Rome	1144–1193	
Most Serene Republic of Lucca	1160–1805	
Haudenosaunee	c. 13th century–1794	
Republic of Massa	1225–1336	
Republic of Sassari	1275–1323	
Old Swiss Confederacy	1291–1798	
Republic of Poljica	1322–1806	
Republic of Senarica	1343–1797	
Pskov Republic	1348–1510	
Dithmarschen	c. 1400 – 1559	
Republic of Cospaia	1440–1826	
Golden Ambrosian Republic	1447–1450	
Most Serene Republic of Venice	697–1797	merchant republic
Republic of Gaeta	839–1140	merchant republic
Republic of Amalfi	839–1131	merchant republic
Bajjāna	886–922	merchant republic
Republic of Ancona	c. 1000 – 1532	merchant republic
Republic of Pisa	c. 1000 – 1406, 1494–1509	merchant republic
Most Serene Republic of Genoa	c. 1100 – 1797	merchant republic
Republic of Noli	1192–1797	merchant republic
Republic of Ragusa	1358–1808	merchant republic

==== Free imperial cities ====
A free imperial city was a self-ruling city member of the Holy Roman Empire that was represented in the Imperial Diet.

Name	Dates
Free Imperial City of Worms	c. 11th century–1789
Free Imperial City of Goslar	1081–1802
Free Imperial City of Aachen	1166–1801
Free Imperial City of Ulm	de jure: 1290–1803; de facto: 1184–1803
Free Imperial City of Besançon	1184–1654
Free Imperial City of Hamburg	1189–1806
Free Imperial City of Konstanz	1192–1548
Free Imperial City of Wetzlar	c. 12th century–1803
Free Imperial City of Friedberg	1211–1806
Free Imperial City of Nördlingen	1215–1803
Free Imperial City of Nuremberg	1219–1806
Free Imperial City of Nordhausen	1220–1802
Free Imperial City of Pfullendorf	1220–1803
Free Imperial City of Lübeck	1226–1811
Free Imperial City of Rheinfelden	1225–1330
Free Imperial City of Colmar	1226–1679
Free Imperial City of Esslingen	1229–1802/3
Free Imperial City of Offenburg	c. 1240–1803
Free Imperial City of Reutlingen	1240–1803
Free Imperial City of Bopfingen	1241–1802
Free Imperial City of Mainz	1241–1462
Free Imperial City of Regensburg	1245–1486; 1496–1803
Free Imperial City of Schweinfurt	1245–1803
Free Imperial City of Windsheim	1248–1802
Free Imperial City of Buchau	c. 1250–1803
Free Imperial City of Mühlhausen	1251–1803
Free Imperial City of Strasbourg	1262–1681
Free Imperial City of Memmigen	1268–1802
Free Imperial City of Rottweil	1268–1802
Free Imperial City of Überlingen	1268–1803
Free Imperial City of Gmünd	1268–1802
Free Imperial City of Rothenburg	1274–1803
Free Imperial City of Buchhorn	1275–1803
Free Imperial City of Lindau	1275–1802
Free Imperial City of Weil	1275–1803
Free Imperial City of Augsburg	1276–1803
Free Imperial City of Ravensburg	1276–1803
Free Imperial City of Hall	1280–1802
Free Imperial City of Biberach an der Riß	1281–1803
Free Imperial City of Kaufbeuren	1286–1803
Free Imperial City of Wangen	1286–1802
Free Imperial City of Cologne	1288–1801
Free Imperial City of Kempten	1289–1802/3
Free Imperial City of Dortmund	1293–1803
Free Imperial City of Leutkirch	1293–1803
Free Imperial City of Speyer	1294–1792
Free Imperial City of Weißenburg	1296–1802
Free Imperial City of Zell am Harmersbach	c. 14th century–1803
Free Imperial City of Wimpfen	c. 1300–1803
Free Imperial City of Donauwörth	1308–1607
Free Imperial City of Mühlhausen	1347–1798
Free Imperial City of Dinkelsbühl	1351–1802
Free Imperial City of Aalen	1360–1803
Free Imperial City of Gengenbach	1360–1803
Free Imperial City of Isny	1365–1803
Free Imperial City of Bremen	de jure: 1654–1811; de facto: 1366–1811
Free Imperial City of Heilbronn	1371–1802
Free Imperial City of Frankfurt	1372–1806
Free Imperial City of Giengen	1391–1803
Free Imperial City of Diessenhofen	1415–1460
Republic of Gersau	1433–1798
Free Imperial City of Soest	1449–1616

=== Early modernity ===
State	Dates of Existence(CE)
Zaporizhian Sich	1552–1775
Polish–Lithuanian Commonwealth	1569–1795
Dutch Republic	1581–1795
Saint-Malo	1590–1594
Republic of Salé	1619–1668
Catalan Republic	September 1640–December 1641
Cossack Hetmanate	1649–1764
Commonwealth of England	1649–1660
Regency of Algiers	1659–1830
Republic of Pirates	1706–1718
Corsican Republic	1755–1769
Republic of Paulava	1769–1795
United States of America	since 1776, constitutional since 1789
Lanfang Republic	1777–1884
Vermont Republic	1777–1791
French First Republic	1792–1804
Republic of Swellendam	1795
Republic of Graaff-Reinet	1795–1796
State of Muskogee	1799–1803

==== Sister republics ====
A sister republic was a client state of France established by French armies or by local revolutionaries and assisted by the French First Republic during the French Revolutionary Wars.

- Republic of Liège (1789–1791)
- United Belgian States (1790)
- Rauracian Republic (1792–1793)
- Republic of Mainz (1793)
- Republic of Bouillon (1794–1795)
- Batavian Republic (1795–1806)
- Republic of Alba (1796)
- Bolognese Republic (1796)
- Republic of Reggio (1796)
- Cispadane Republic (1796–1797)
- Transpadane Republic (1796–1797)
- Republic of Asti (1797)
- Republic of Bergamo (1797)
- Republic of Brescia (1797)
- Republic of Crema (1797)
- Anconine Republic (1797–1798)
- Cisalpine Republic (1797–1802)
- Cisrhenian Republic (1797–1802)
- Ligurian Republic (1797–1805)
- Lemanic Republic (1798)
- Tiberina Republic (1798)
- Republic of Connacht (1798)
- Piedmontese Republic (1798–1799)
- Helvetic Republic (1798–1802)
- Roman Republic (1798–1799)
- Republic of Pescara (1799)
- Parthenopean Republic (1799)
- Republic of Lucca (1799–1805)
- Subalpine Republic (1800–1802)
- Italian Republic (1802–1805)
- Rhodanic Republic (1802–1810)
- Swiss Confederation (1803–1815)
- Republic of Ragusa (1806–1808)
- Free City of Danzig (1807–1814)

=== Modernity ===
==== 19th century ====
===== Africa =====
- Republic of Liberia (since 1847)
- Republic of Maryland (1853–1857)
- South African Republic (1856–1877; 1881–1902)
- Orange Free State (1854–1902)
- Natalia Republic (1839–1843)
- Goshen Republic (1882–1883)
- Stellaland Republic (1882–1885)
- Nieuwe Republiek (1884–1888)
- Griqualand East (1862–1879)
- Griqualand West (1800–1880)
- Philippopolis, South Africa
- Griekwastad (Griquatown)
- Ibadan Republic (1838–1893)

===== North America =====
- First Republic of Haiti (1806–1811)
- State of Haiti (1810–1811)
- Republic of West Florida (1810)
- Republic of East Florida (1812)
- Republic of the Floridas (1817)
- Republic of Spanish Haiti (1821–1822)
- Federal Republic of Central America (1823–1841)
- First Mexican United States (1824–1835)
- Republic of Madawaska (1827)
- Republic of Indian Stream (1832–1835)
- Centralist Republic of Mexico (1835–1846)
- Republic of Texas (1836–1845)
- Republic of Canada (1837–1838)
- State of Los Altos (1838–1840; 1848–1849)
- Republic of Lower Canada (1838)
- Free State of Costa Rica (1838–1847)
- Republic of Honduras (1838–1896)
- Republic of Nicaragua (1838–1896)
- Republic of the Rio Grande (1840)
- Republic of Yucatán (1840–1843; 1846–1848)
- Republic of Guatemala (since 1840)
- Republic of El Salvador (1841–1896)
- First Dominican Republic (1844–1861)
- California Republic (June–July 1846)
- Second Mexican United States (1846–1863)
- First Costa Rican Republic (1848–1948)
- State of Deseret (1849–1850)
- Republic of Baja California (15 October 1853–January 1854)
- Republic of Sonora (15 October 1853 – 8 May 1854)
- Second Republic of Haiti (since 1859)
- Confederate States of America (1860–1865)
- Second Dominican Republic (1865–1916)
- United States of Mexico (since 1867)
- Republic of Manitobah (1867–1869)
- United States of Central America (1896–1898)
- Republic of El Salvador (since 1898)
- Republic of Honduras (since 1898)
- Republic of Nicaragua (since 1898)

===== South America =====
- Republic of Paraguay (since 1811)
- American Confederation of Venezuela (1811–1819)
- United Provinces of the Río de la Plata (1816–1831)
- Republic of Chile (since 1818)
- Republic of Gran Colombia (1819–1831)
- Free Province of Guayaquil (1820–1822)
- Republic of Entre Ríos (1820–1821)
- Republic of Tucumán (1820–1821)
- Republic of Peru (1824–1836)
- Republic of Bolivia (1825–1836)
- Oriental Republic of Uruguay (since 1828)
- Republic of Ecuador (since 1830)
- State of Venezuela (1830–1864)
- Argentine Confederation (1831–1861)
- Republic of New Granada (1831–1858)
- Republic of South Peru (1836)
- Republic of North Peru (1836)
- Peru–Bolivian Confederation (1836–1839)
- Riograndense Republic (1836–1845)
- Juliana Republic (1839)
- Republic of Peru (since 1839)
- Republic of Bolivia (1839–2009)
- State of Buenos Aires (1852–1861)
- Granadine Confederation (1858–1863)
- Argentine Republic (since 1861)
- United States of Colombia (1863–1886)
- United States of Venezuela (1864–1953)
- Republic of Colombia (since 1886)
- Republic of Independent Guiana (20 July 1886 – 1891)
- Republic of the United States of Brazil (1889–1930)

===== Asia =====
- Lanfang Republic (1777–1884)
- Republic of Ezo (1868–1869)
- Zheltuga Republic (1883–1886)
- Republic of Formosa (1895)
- Republic of Biak-na-Bato (1897)
- First Philippine Republic (1898–1901)

===== Europe =====
- Septinsular Republic (1800–1815)
- Republic of Gersau (1814–1818)
- Republic of Genoa (1814–1815)
- (Switzerland) Swiss Confederation (1814–1848)
- United States of the Ionian Islands (1815–1864)
- Free City of Cracow (1815–1846)
- Free City of Bremen (1815–1871)
- Free City of Hamburg (1815–1871)
- Free City of Lübeck (1815–1871)
- Free City of Frankfurt (1816–1866)
- Neutral Moresnet (1816–1920)
- First Hellenic Republic (1828–1832)
- (France) Second French Republic (1848–1852)
- Swiss Confederation (since 1848)
- Free Cities of Menton and Roquebrune (1848–1849)
- Roman Republic (February–April 1849)
- Republic of San Marco (March 1848–August 1849)
- (France) Third French Republic (1871–1940)
- First Spanish Republic (1873–1874)
- Cantons of Alcoy, Algeciras, Alicante, Almansa, Andújar, Bailén, Béjar, Cádiz, Camuñas, Castellón de la Plana, Córdoba, Granada, Gualchos, Huelva, Jaén, Jumilla, Loja, Málaga, Motril, Murcia, Orihuela, Plasencia, Salamanca, San Fernando, Sevilla, Tarifa, Torrevieja, Valencia (1873) and Cartagena (1873–1874)
- Republic of Tamrash (1878–1886)

===== Oceania =====
- Independent Commune of Franceville (1889)
- (Hawaii) Republic of Hawai'i (1894–1898)

==== 20th century ====
Africa

- Tripolitanian Republic (16 November 1918 – 1922)
- Confederal Republic of the Tribes of the Rif (18 September 1921 – 27 May 1926)
- Egypt (since 1953)
- Sudan (since 1956)
- Tunisia (since 1957)
- Ghana (since 1960)
- Benin (since 1960)
- Madagascar (since 1960)
- Mauritania (since 1960)
- Somalia (since 1960)
- Cameroon (since 1961)
- South Africa (since 1961)
- Nigeria (since 1963)
- Rwanda (since 1962)
- Algeria (since 1962)
- Republic of Tanganyika (9 December 1962 – 26 April 1964)
- Uganda (since 1963)
- Kenya (since 1963)
- Malawi (since 1964)
- Zambia (since 1964)
- People's Republic of Zanzibar (12 January 1964 – 26 April 1964)
- Tanzania (since 26 April 1964)
- (The Gambia) Gambia (since 1965)
- Botswana (since 1966)
- Burundi (since 1966)
- Biafra (30 May 1967 – 15 January 1970)
- Equatorial Guinea (since 1968)
- Libya (since 1969)
- Central African Republic (since 1970)
- Rhodesia (2 March 1970 – 11 December 1979)
- Sierra Leone (since 1971)
- Ethiopia (since 1974)
- Cape Verde (since 1975)
- Mozambique (since 1975)
- São Tomé and Príncipe (since 1975)
- Western Sahara (since 1976)
- Seychelles (since 1976)
- Transkei (26 October 1976 – 27 April 1994)
- Bophuthatswana (6 December 1977 – 28 April 1994)
- Venda (13 September 1979 – 28 April 1994)
- Zimbabwe (since 1980)
- Ciskei (4 December 1981 – 28 April 1994)
- Namibia (since 1990)
- Somaliland (since 1991)
- Mauritius (since 1992)

America

- (Acre (state)) Republic of Acre (1st: 15 July 1899 – 15 March 1900; 2nd: November 1900–24 December 1900 3rd: 27 January 1903 – 11 November 1903)
- Republic of Cuba (since 20 May 1902)
- Republic of Panama (since 3 November 1903)
- First United States of Brazil (16 July 1934 – 29 October 1945)
- Second United States of Brazil (31 January 1946 – 31 March 1964)
- Second Republic of Costa Rica (since 7 November 1949)
- Third Dominican Republic (1924–12 July 1965)
- Republic of Venezuela (11 April 1953 – 15 December 1999)
- Fourth Dominican Republic (since 1 July 1966)
- Republic of Anguilla (12 July 1967 – 19 March 1969)
- Co-operative Republic of Guyana (since 23 February 1970)
- Republic of Suriname (since 25 November 1975)
- Republic of Trinidad and Tobago (since 1 August 1976)
- Commonwealth of Dominica (since 3 November 1978)
- Federative Republic of Brazil (since 15 March 1985)
- Bolivarian Republic of Venezuela (since 15 December 1999)

Asia

- (Taiwan) Republic of China (since 1 January 1912, since 7 December 1949 only in Taiwan; widely recognized until 25 October 1971)
- Transcaucasian Democratic Federative Republic (22 April 1918 – 28 May 1918)
- Democratic Republic of Armenia (28 May 1918 – 2 December 1920)
- Democratic Republic of Azerbaijan (28 May 1918 – 28 April 1920)
- Kars Republic (1 December 1918 – 19 April 1919)
- Republic of Aras (December 1918 – Mid-June 1919)
- Azerbaijan Soviet Socialist Republic (28 April 1920 – 12 March 1922)
- Armenian Soviet Socialist Republic (2 December 1920 – 12 March 1922)
- (First Republic of Armenia) Republic of Mountainous Armenia (26 April 1921 – 13 July 1921)
- Tuvan People's Republic (14 August 1921 – 11 October 1944)
- Republic of Turkey (since 29 October 1923)
- Tungus Republic (1924 - 1925)
- Mongolian People's Republic (24 November 1924 – 13 February 1992)
- Commonwealth of the Philippines (15 November 1935 – 4 July 1946)
- (Philippines) Second Philippine Republic (14 November 1943 – 11 June 1945)
- (Lebanon) Lebanese Republic (de jure: since 22 November 1943; de facto: since 31 December 1946)
- Republic of Indonesia (since 17 August 1945)
- Republic of the Union of Myanmar (since 4 January 1948)
- (Philippines) Third Philippine Republic (4 July 1946 – 30 December 1965)
- State of Israel (since 14 May 1948)
- (South Korea) Republic of Korea (since 15 August 1948)
- (North Korea) Democratic People's Republic of Korea (since 9 September 1948)
- North Vietnam (since 2 September 1945)
- South Vietnam (26 October 1955 – 30 April 1975)
- People's Republic of China (since 1 October 1949; widely recognized since 25 October 1971)
- Republic of South Maluku (15 April 1950 – 12 April 1963)
- Republic of India (since 26 January 1950)
- Pakistan (since 1956)
- Iraq (since 1958)
- Cyprus (since 1960)
- Singapore (since 1965)
- (Philippines) Fourth Philippine Republic (30 December 1965–22/25 February 1986)
- Yemen (since 1990)
- Maldives (since 1968)
- Bangladesh (since 1971)
- Sri Lanka (since 1972)
- Afghanistan (1973–1992)
- Lao People's Democratic Republic (since 2 December 1975)
- Islamic Republic of Iran (since 1979)
- Northern Cyprus (since 1983; disputed)
- Republic of the Philippines (since 22/25 February 1986)
- State of Palestine (since 1988)
- Armenia (since 1991)
- Republic of Artsakh (1991–2023)
- Georgia (since 1991)
- South Ossetia (since 1991; disputed)
- Abkhazia (since 1992; disputed)
- Mongolia (since 1992)

Europe

- Kruševo Republic (3 August 1903 – 13 August 1903)
- (Portugal) First Portuguese Republic (5 October 1910 – 26 May 1926)
- Independent Government of Western Thrace (31 August 1913 – 25 October 1913)
- Republic of Finland (since 6 December 1917)
- (Russia) Russian Republic (1917)
- (Ukraine) Ukrainian People's Republic (25 January 1917 – 29 April 1918; 14 December 1918 – 18 March 1921)
- Mountainous Republic of the Northern Caucasus (11 May 1917–January 1921)
- Crimean People's Republic (13 December 1917–January 1918)
- Moldavian Democratic Republic (6 February 1918 – 10 December 1918)
- Kuban People's Republic (16 February 1918 – 17 March 1920)
- Belarusian People's Republic (9 March 1918 – 1919)
- Republic of Lithuania (since 16 February 1918)
- Republic of Estonia (since 24 February 1918)
- Don Republic (18 May 1918 – 1920)
- Democratic Republic of Georgia (26 May 1918 – 25 April 1921)
- (Poland) Commonwealth of Zakopane (13 October 1918 – 16 November 1918)
- (Ukraine) West Ukrainian People's Republic (18 October 1918 – 22 January 1919)
- (Ukraine) Komancza Republic (4 November 1918 – 24 January 1919)
- Republic of Tarnobrzeg (6 November 1918–Spring 1919)
- People's State of Bavaria (8 November 1918 – 6 April 1919)
- Republic of German-Austria (12 November 1918 – 10 September 1919)
- (Poland) Second Polish Republic (16 November 1918 – 6 October 1939)
- Republic of Latvia (since 18 November 1918)
- (Czechoslovakia) First Czechoslovak Republic (28 October 1918 – 30 September 1938)
- Lemko-Rusyn People's Republic (5 December 1918–March 1920)
- (Austria) First Austrian Republic (10 September 1919 – 1 May 1934)
- Free State of Fiume (12 November 1920 – 22 February 1924)
- Republic of Central Lithuania (12 October 1920 – 24 March 1922)
- Free City of Danzig (15 November 1920 – 2 September 1939)
- Georgian Soviet Socialist Republic (25 February 1921 – 12 March 1922)
- (Soviet Union) Union of Soviet Socialist Republics (1922–1991)
- Republic of Turkey (since 29 October 1923)
- Second Hellenic Republic (1924–1935)
- (Catalonia) Catalan Republic (14 April 1931 – 17 April 1931)
- (Spain) Second Spanish Republic (de facto: 1931–1939; de jure: 1931–1975)
- Ireland (since 29 December 1949)
- (Czechoslovakia) Second Czechoslovak Republic (30 September 1938 – 15 March 1939)
- Carpatho-Ukraine (30 December 1938 – 18 March 1939)
- (Slovakia) Slovak State (14 March 1939 – 4 April 1945)
- (France) Fourth French Republic (1946–1958)
- Italian Republic (since 2 June 1946)
- Albania (est. 1946)
- Romania (est. 1947, communist government from 1948 to 1989)
- (France) Fifth French Republic (since 1958)
- (Greece) Third Hellenic Republic (since 1974)
- Malta (since 1974)
- Transnistria (since 1990; disputed)

Oceania

- Republic of West Papua (1961–1963)
- Independent State of Samoa (since 1 January 1962)
- Republic of Nauru (since 31 January 1968)
- Nation of Tanna (1974)
- Republic of the North Solomons (1975–1976)
- Republic of Palau (since 2 April 1979)
- Republic of the Marshall Islands (since 1979)
- Republic of Kiribati (since 12 July 1979)
- Tafea Nation (1980)
- Republic of Vanuatu (since 30 July 1980)
- Republic of Vemerana (1980)
- Federated States of Micronesia (since 3 November 1986)
- Republic of Fiji (since 7 October 1987)
- Republic of Rotuma (1987–1988)

==== 21st century and later ====
- Democratic Republic of Timor-Leste (since 20 May 2002)
- Islamic Republic of Afghanistan (26 January 2004 – 15 August 2021)
- Republic of Kosovo (since 17 February 2008)
- Federal Democratic Republic of Nepal (since 28 May 2008)
- Plurinational State of Bolivia (since 7 February 2009)
- State of Libya (since 17 February 2011)
- Republic of South Sudan (since 9 July 2011)
- Barbados (since 30 November 2021)

== List by type ==
In modern usage, a republican system of government is loosely applied to any state which claims this designation. For example, the Dominican Republic under Rafael Trujillo is considered a republic, as is the Republic of Iraq under Saddam Hussein.

=== Arab republics ===
- (Tripolitania) Tripolitanian Republic (1918–1922)
- Arab Republic of Egypt (1953–present)
- (Western Sahara) Sahrawi Arab Democratic Republic (1976–present)
- (Syria) Syrian Arab Republic (1961–present)
- United Arab Republic (1958–1971)
- Yemen Arab Republic (1962–1990)
- (Libya) Libyan Arab Republic (1969–1977)

=== Confederal republics ===
Confederal republics are associations of sovereign states, usually having power over critical common issues such as defense and foreign policy:

- Confederate States of America (1861–1865)
- Senegambia Confederation (1982–1989)
- United States of America (under the Second Continental Congress and the Articles of Confederation, 1776–1789)

=== Crowned republics ===
A crowned republic, is a form of constitutional monarchy where the monarch's role is commonly seen as largely ceremonial and where all the royal prerogatives are prescribed by custom and law in such a way that the monarch has limited discretion over governmental and constitutional issues.

- United Kingdom (1707–present)
- Kingdom of Denmark (1849–present)
- Kingdom of Norway (1905–present)
- Commonwealth of Australia (1986–present)
- Realm of New Zealand (1947–present)
- Japan (1952–present)
- Canada (1982–present)
- Kingdom of Greece (1864–1967)
- Union of South Africa (1910–1961)
- Malaya (1957–1963)
- Malaysia (1963–present)
- Thailand (1932–present)

=== Democratic republics ===
Democratic republics are usually socialist states, although not all of them are necessarily socialist.

- (North Korea) Democratic People's Republic of Korea (1948–present)
- Democratic Republic of the Congo (1966–1971, 1997–present)
- Democratic Republic of São Tomé and Príncipe (1975–present)
- Democratic Republic of Timor-Leste (1975–present)
- (North Vietnam) Democratic Republic of Vietnam (1945–1975)
- (Western Sahara) Sahrawi Arab Democratic Republic (1976–present)
- Democratic Socialist Republic of Sri Lanka (1978–present)
- Federal Democratic Republic of Ethiopia (1991–present)
- Federal Democratic Republic of Nepal (2008–present)
- (East Germany) German Democratic Republic (1949–1990)
- (Laos) Lao People's Democratic Republic (1975–present)
- People's Democratic Republic of Algeria (1962–present)
- (South Yemen) People's Democratic Republic of Yemen (1967–1990)

=== Federal republics ===
Federal republics are federal states in which the administrative divisions (states or provinces) theoretically retain a degree of autonomy which is constitutionally protected, and cannot be revoked unilaterally by the national government. Federal republics are not unitary states.

- Bolivarian Republic of Venezuela
- Bosnia and Herzegovina (since 1995)
- Commonwealth of England (1649–1653)
- Regency of Algiers (1659–1830)
- Czechoslovakia: Czechoslovak Socialist Republic (1969–1990), Czech and Slovak Federative Republic (1990–1992)
- Federal Democratic Republic of Ethiopia (unitary republic 1974–1994; federal republic since 1994)
- Federal Republic of Cameroon (1961–1972)
- Federal Republic of Somalia (since August 2012)
- Federative Republic of Brazil (since 15 November 1889)
- Federal Republic of Germany (since 1949)
- Gran Colombia (Republic of Colombia) (1819–1886), known as Great Colombia from 1819 to 1831, when it included present-day Ecuador, Venezuela and Panama.
- Islamic Republic of Pakistan (since 1956)
- Second Federal Republic of Mexico (1846–1864)
- United Mexican States (since 1917)
- Federal Democratic Republic of Nepal (since 2007)
- Federal Republic of Nigeria (1963–66:1st Republic, 1979–83: 2nd Republic, 1993: 3rd Republic, 1999–present: 4th Republic)
- Argentine Republic (since 1852)
- Republic of India (since 26 January 1950)
- Republic of South Sudan (since 9 July 2011)
- Republic of Sudan (since 1 January 1956)
- Republic of Austria
- Russian Federation (since 7 November 1917; up to 1991 it was named Russian Soviet Federative Socialist Republic)
- State Union of Serbia and Montenegro (2003–2006)
- Swiss Confederation (1848–present), a federal republic but called the Swiss Confederation
- Union of Soviet Socialist Republics (1922–1991)
- United Provinces of Central America (1823–1840)
- United States of America (since 1789)
- United States of Indonesia (1949–1950)
- Yugoslavia: Federal People's Republic of Yugoslavia (1946–1963), Socialist Federal Republic of Yugoslavia (1963–1992), Federal Republic of Yugoslavia (1992–2003)

=== Islamic republics ===
Republics governed in accordance with Islamic law:

- Islamic Republic of Afghanistan (2004–2021)
- Islamic Republic of Iran (since 1979)
- Islamic Republic of Mauritania (1960–2017)
- Islamic Republic of Mauritania (since 2017)
- Islamic Republic of Pakistan (since 1956)

=== People's republics ===
People's republics are said to be governed by the people. The name is most often (but not always) used by communist states.

==== Current people's republics ====
- (North Korea) Democratic People's Republic of Korea
- People's Democratic Republic of Algeria
- (Laos) Lao People's Democratic Republic
- People's Republic of Bangladesh
- People's Republic of China

==== Former people's republics ====
- (Socialist Federal Republic of Yugoslavia) Federal People's Republic of Yugoslavia (1946–1963)
- (Libya) Great Socialist People's Libyan Arab Jamahiriya (1977–2011)
- (Mongolia) Mongolian People's Republic (1924–1992)
- (South Yemen) People's Democratic Republic of Yemen (1967–1970)
- People's Republic of Albania (1946–1976)
- People's Republic of Angola (1975–1992)
- People's Republic of Benin (1975–1990)
- People's Republic of Bulgaria (1946–1990)
- People's Republic of the Congo (1970–1992)
- People's Republic of Hungary (1949–1989)
- People's Republic of Mozambique (1975–1990)
- People's Republic of Poland (1952–1989)
- People's Democratic Republic of Ethiopia (1987–1991)
- (Romania) Romanian People's Republic (1947–1965)

=== Socialist republics ===
These are republics that use the word "socialist" in their official name.

- Armenian Soviet Socialist Republic (1920–1990)
- Azerbaijan Soviet Socialist Republic (1920–1991)
- Byelorussian Soviet Socialist Republic (1920–1991)
- Czechoslovak Socialist Republic (1960–1990)
- Democratic Socialist Republic of Sri Lanka
- (Libya) Great Socialist People's Libyan Arab Jamahiriya (1977–2011)
- Socialist Federal Republic of Yugoslavia (1963–1992)
- People's Socialist Republic of Albania (1976–1990)
- Socialist Republic of Romania (1965–1989)
- Socialist Republic of Vietnam (since 1976)
- Ukrainian Soviet Socialist Republic (1919–1991)
- (Soviet Union) Union of Soviet Socialist Republics (1922–1991)

=== Unitary republics ===
Unitary republics are unitary states which are governed constitutionally as one single unit, with a single constitutionally created legislature. Unitary states are not federations or confederations.

- Islamic Republic of Afghanistan (2004–2021)
- Republic of Acre (1st: 1899–1900; 2nd: 1900; 3rd: 1903)
- Republic of Albania (since 1946)
- People's Democratic Republic of Algeria
- Republic of Angola (since 1975)
- Republic of Armenia (1st: 28 May 1918; Current: 25 December 1991)
- Republic of Azerbaijan (1st: 28 May 1918; re-established: 18 October 1991)
- People's Republic of Bangladesh
- Barbados (since 30 November 2021)
- Republic of Benin
- Republic of Bophuthatswana (1977–1994)
- Plurinational State of Bolivia
- Republic of Botswana (since 1966)
- Republic of Bulgaria (since 1946)
- Burkina Faso
- Republic of the Union of Myanmar (Burma)
- Republic of Burundi (since 1966)
- Republic of Cameroon
- Republic of Cape Verde
- Republic of Chad
- Central African Republic (1958–1976; restored 1979)
- Republic of Chile
- People's Republic of China
- Republic of China (Taiwan)
- Republic of Ciskei (1981–1994)
- Republic of Colombia (unitary republic since 1886)
- Democratic Republic of the Congo
- Republic of the Congo
- Corsican Republic (1755–1769)
- Cospaia (1440–1826)
- Republic of Costa Rica
- Republic of Croatia
- Republic of Cuba
- Republic of Cyprus
- Czech Republic
- Commonwealth of Dominica
- Dominican Republic (1821–1822, 1844–1861, 1865–present)
- Republic of Djibouti
- Republic of Ecuador
- Arab Republic of Egypt (since 1953)
- Republic of El Salvador (1821–present)
- Republic of Equatorial Guinea
- State of Eritrea
- Republic of Estonia (since 1918)
- Republic of Ezo (1868–1869)
- Independent Commune of Franceville (1889)
- Republic of Fiji (since 1987)
- Republic of Finland (since 1919)
- Finnish Democratic Republic (1 December 1939 to 12 March 1940)
- Republic of Formosa (1895)
- French Republic
- Gabonese Republic
- Republic of the Gambia (since 1970)
- Georgia
- Republic of Ghana (since 1960)
- Hellenic Republic (First Hellenic Republic (1822–1832))
- Republic of Guatemala
- Republic of Guinea
- Republic of Guinea-Bissau
- Co-operative Republic of Guyana (since 1970)
- Republic of Haiti (1806–1849; restored 1859)
- Republic of Hawaii (1894–1898)
- Republic of Honduras
- Republic of Hungary (since 1946)
- Republic of Iceland (republic since 1944)
- Republic of Indonesia (unitary republic since August 1950)
- Israel (since 14 May 1948)
- Italian Republic (since 1946)
- Italian Social Republic (1943–1945)
- Islamic Republic of Iran (since 1979)
- Republic of Iraq (since 1958)
- Ireland (since 1949)
- Republic of Ivory Coast
- Republic of Kazakhstan
- Republic of Kenya (since 1964)
- Republic of Kiribati (since 1979)
- Republic of Korea (since 1948)
- Democratic People's Republic of Korea (since 1948)
- Republic of Kuwait (1990)
- Kyrgyz Republic
- Lao People's Democratic Republic (since 1975)
- Republic of Latvia
- Republic of Lebanon (22 November 1943)
- Republic of Liberia
- Great Socialist People's Libyan Arab Jamahiriya (1969–2011)
- Republic of Lithuania
- Lokot Republic (1941–1943)
- Republic of Madagascar
- Republic of Malawi (since 1966)
- Republic of Maldives (since 1968)
- Republic of Mali (since 1960)
- Republic of Malta (since 1974)
- Republic of the Marshall Islands (since 1979)
- Islamic Republic of Mauritania
- Republic of Mauritius (since 1992)
- Menton and Roquebrune (1848–1861)
- Republic of Moldova
- State of Mongolia (since 1924)
- Republic of Montenegro (since 2006)
- Republic of Mozambique
- State of Muskogee (1799–1803)
- Republic of Namibia
- Republic of Nauru
- Republic of Nicaragua
- Republic of Niger
- Republic of North Macedonia (since 1991)
- Republic of Palau (since 1981)
- Republic of Panama
- Republic of Paraguay
- Republic of Peru
- Republic of the Philippines (since 1946)
- Republic of Poland
- Portuguese Republic (since 1910)
- Republic of Rhodesia (1970–1979)
- Romania (since 1947)
- Republic of Rwanda (since 1961)
- Independent State of Samoa (since 1962)
- Most Serene Republic of San Marino (since 301)
- Democratic Republic of São Tomé and Príncipe
- Republic of Senegal
- Republic of Serbia
- Republic of Seychelles
- Republic of Sierra Leone (since 1971)
- Republic of Singapore (since 1965)
- Slovak Republic (1939–1945)
- Republic of Slovenia
- Republic of South Africa (since 1961)
- Republic of Spain (1931–1939)
- Democratic Socialist Republic of Sri Lanka (since 1972)
- Republic of Suriname
- Syrian Arab Republic
- Republic of Tajikistan
- United Republic of Tanzania
- Republic of Texas (1836–1845)
- Democratic Republic of Timor-Leste
- Togolese Republic
- Republic of Transkei (1976–1994)
- Republic of Trinidad and Tobago (since 1976)
- Tunisian Republic (since 1957)
- Republic of Turkey (since 1923)
- Turkmenistan
- Republic of Uganda (since 1963)
- Ukraine
- Republic of Upper Volta (1958–1984)
- Oriental Republic of Uruguay
- Republic of Uzbekistan
- Republic of Vanuatu
- Republic of Venda (1979–1994)
- Vermont Republic (1777–1791)
- Republic of Vietnam (1955–1975)
- Republic of West Florida (1810)
- Republic of Yemen (since 1962)
- Republic of Zambia (since 1964)
- Republic of Zimbabwe

=== Republics of Russia ===
- Republic of Adygea
- Republic of Chechnya
- Republic of Dagestan
- Republic of Ingushetia
- Republic of Kabardino-Balkaria
- Republic of Kalmykia
- Republic of North Ossetia-Alania
- (Altai Republic) Republic of Altai
- Republic of Bashkortostan
- Republic of Buryatia
- Republic of Chuvashia
- Republic of Karelia
- Republic of Khakassia
- (Komi Republic) Republic of Komi
- Republic of Mari El
- Republic of Mordovia
- (Sakha Republic) Republic of Sakha (Yakutia)
- Republic of Tatarstan
- Republic of Tuva
- Republic of Udmurtia

=== Disputed separatist republics ===
- Republic of China (Taiwan) (since 1971, unrecognized)
- Republic of Abkhazia
- Republic of South Ossetia
- Gagauz Republic (1990–1995)
- Pridnestrovian Moldovan Republic
- Republic of Kosovo
- Republika Srpska (1992–1995)
- Dubrovnik Republic (1991–1992)
- Republic of Serbian Krajina (1991–1995)
- Republic of Artsakh (1991–2023)
- Kurdish Republic of Lachin (1992)
- Turkish Republic of Northern Cyprus (since 1983)
- Republic of Somaliland (since 1991)
- Donetsk People's Republic
- Luhansk People's Republic
- Republic of Crimea
- Chechen Republic of Ichkeria (1991–2000)
- Republic of Tatarstan (1992–1994)
- (Catalonia) Catalan Republic (2017)

== See also ==
- Republicanism

== Sources ==
- Robinson, E. W. (1997). The First Democracies: Early Popular Government Outside Athens. Franz Steiner Verlag. ISBN 3-515-06951-8.
- Sharma, J. P. (1968). Republics in Ancient India, C. 1500 B.C.-500 B.C. Leiden, Netherlands: E. J. Brill. pp. 207–217. ISBN 978-9-004-02015-3.
