= List of French client states =

French client states were territories directly influenced or controlled by France, often established during periods of political expansion, such as the Napoleonic era. These states served as strategic allies or buffer zones, with governments typically aligned with French interests and policies. Spanning Europe, Africa, Southeast Asia, and the Americas, these client states played a significant role in extending France's geopolitical reach.

== Client states of the First Empire ==
First French Empire (1804–1814, 1815)
Principality of Elba (1814–1815)

=== Former Holy Roman Empire ===
- County of Wetzlar (1803–1810)
- Principality of Erfurt (1807–1814)
- Confederation of the Rhine (1806–1813)
  - Forest- and Rhine-County of Salm-Horstmar (1803–1813)
  - County of Salm-Reifferscheid-Dyck (1806–1811)
  - Grand Duchy of Baden
  - Electorate of Bavaria (1805)
  - Kingdom of Bavaria (1806-1813)
  - Grand Duchy of Berg
  - Grand Duchy of Hesse-Darmstadt
  - Principality of Regensburg (1803–1810)
  - Kingdom of Saxony (1806-1813)
  - Kingdom of Westphalia (1807–1813)
  - Kingdom of Württemberg
  - Grand Duchy of Würzburg (1806–1814)
  - Duchy of Anhalt-Bernburg (1807–1813)
  - Duchy of Anhalt-Dessau (1807–1813)
  - Duchy of Anhalt-Köthen (1807–1813)
  - Duchy of Arenberg (1803–1810)
  - Principality of Hohenzollern-Hechingen
  - Principality of Hohenzollern-Sigmaringen
  - Principality of Isenburg (1806–1815)
  - Principality of Leyen (1806–1814)
  - Principality of Liechtenstein (1806-1813)
  - Principality of Lippe-Detmold (1807–1813)
  - Duchy of Mecklenburg-Schwerin (1808–1813)
  - Duchy of Mecklenburg-Strelitz (1808–1813)
  - Duchy of Nassau
  - Duchy of Oldenburg (1808–1813)
  - Principality of Reuss-Ebersdorf (1807–1813)
  - Principality of Reuss-Greiz (1807–1813)
  - Principality of Reuss-Lobenstein (1807–1813)
  - Principality of Reuss-Schleiz (1807–1813)
  - Principality of Salm (1802–1810)
  - Duchy of Saxe-Coburg
  - Duchy of Saxe-Gotha
  - Duchy of Saxe-Hildburghausen
  - Duchy of Saxe-Meiningen
  - Duchy of Saxe-Weimar (1806–1809)
  - Duchy of Saxe-Eisenach (1806–1809)
  - Grand Duchy of Saxe-Weimar-Eisenach (1809–1813)
  - Principality of Schaumburg-Lippe (1807–1813)
  - Principality of Schwarzburg-Rudolstadt (1807–1813)
  - Principality of Schwarzburg-Sondershausen (1807–1813)
  - Principality of Waldeck-Pyrmont (1807–1813)
  - Grand Duchy of Frankfurt (1810–1813)
  - Principality of Aschaffenburg (1803–1810)

=== Italy ===
- Principality of Lucca and Piombino (1805–1814)
- (Kingdom of Italy (Napoleonic)) Kingdom of Etruria (1801–1807)
- (Kingdom of Italy (Napoleonic)) Kingdom of Italy (1805–1814)
- Kingdom of Naples (1806–1808)
- Grand Duchy of Tuscany (1807–1814)
- Principality of Benevento (1806–1815)
- Principality of Pontecorvo (1806–1815)
- Duchy of Guastalla (1806)
- Duchy of Massa and Carrara (1796–1814)

=== Rest of Europe ===
- Kingdom of Prussia (1807–1813)
- Principality of Neuchâtel (1806–1814)
- Duchy of Warsaw (1807–1815)
- Free City of Danzig (1807–1814)
- Kingdom of Spain (1808–1813)
- Kingdom of Holland (1806–1810)
- Swiss Confederation (1803–1814)
- Principality of Andorra (1806–1814, 1815)
- Lithuanian Provisional Governing Commission (1812–1813)
- Duchy of Siewierz (1807–1815)
- Duchy of Courland, Semigallia and Pilten (1812)
- Septinsular Republic (1807–1814)

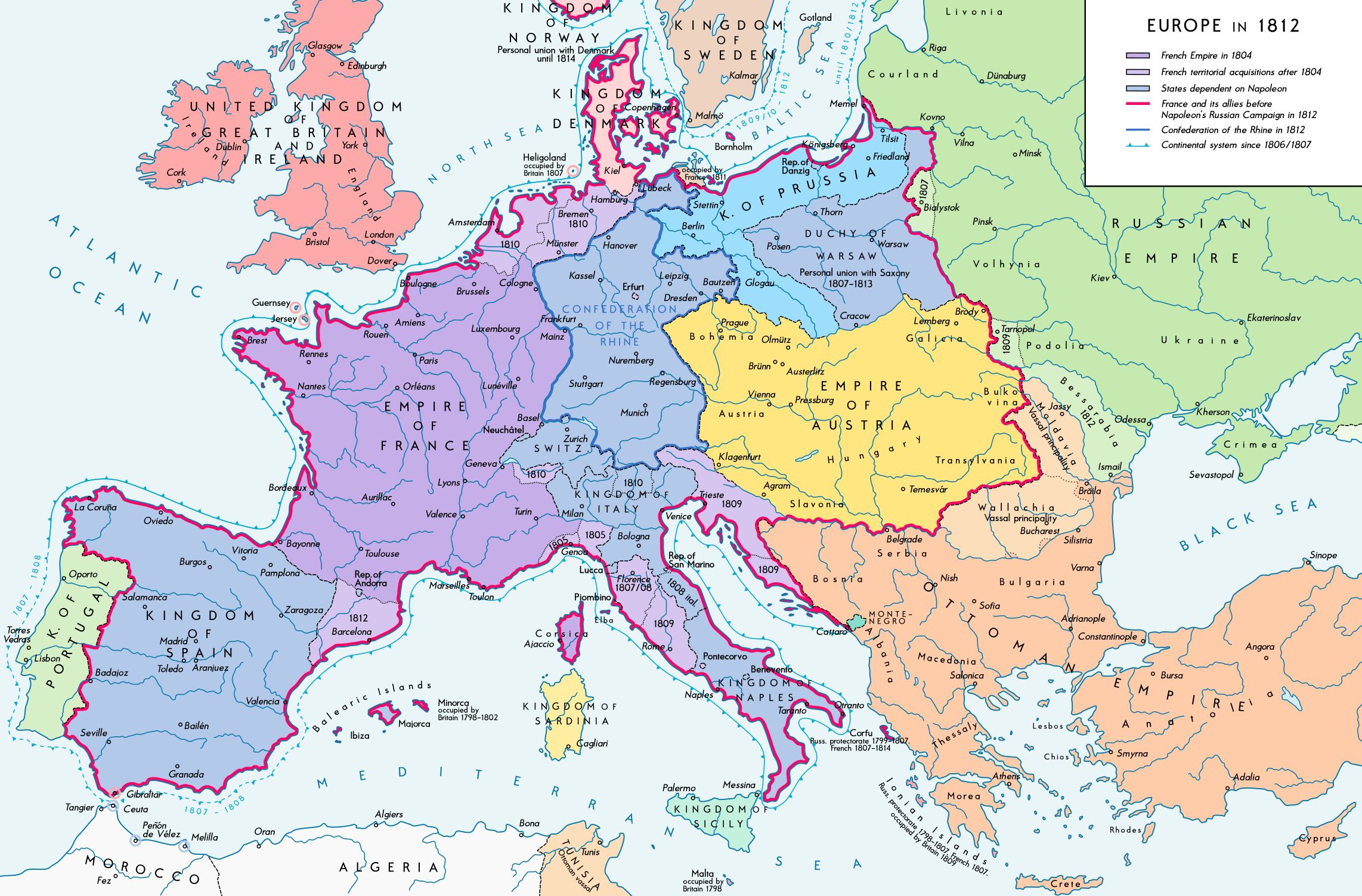
Europe in 1812

France had several puppet states between 1792–1815 (the French First Republic and the First French Empire) and 1852–1870 (the Second French Empire).

== Sister republics ==
French First Republic (1792–1804)

=== Former Holy Roman Empire ===
- Rauracian Republic (1792–1793)
- Republic of Mainz (1793)
- Cisrhenian Republic (1797–1802)
- Republic of Bouillon (1794–1795)

=== Italy ===
- Republic of Crema (1797)
- Cispadane Republic (1796–1797)
- Bolognese Republic (1796)
- Transpadane Republic (1796–1797)
- Republic of Alba (1796)
- Republic of Brescia (1797)
- Republic of Bergamo (1797)
- Cisalpine Republic (1797–1802)
- Italian Republic (1802–1805)
- Anconine Republic (1797–1798)
- Ligurian Republic (1797–1805)
- (French First Republic) Tiberina Republic (1798)
- Roman Republic (1798–1799)
- Altamura (1799)
- Subalpine Republic (1800–1802)
- Piedmontese Republic (1798–1799)
- Parthenopean Republic (1799)
- Republic of Pescara (1799)
- Republic of Lucca (1799–1805)
- Astese Republic (1797)
- Reggiana Republic (1796)

=== Rest of Europe ===
- Batavian Republic (1795–1806)
- Helvetic Republic (1798–1803)
- Lemanic Republic (1798)
- Valais Republic (1802–1810)
- Irish Republic (1798)

== Second French Empire ==
French Second Republic (1848–1852)
Second French Empire (1852–1870)

- Second Mexican Empire (1863–1867)
- Principality of Andorra (1848–1870)
- Papal States (1849–1870)
- Principality of Monaco (1861–1918)
