= 1793 Rauracian Republic annexation referendum =

March 4–7, 1793

Results
Choice	Votes	%
Yes	1,855	96.87%
No	60	3.13%
Valid votes	1,915	86.46%
Invalid or blank votes	300	13.54%
Total votes	2,215	100.00%
Registered voters/turnout	9,225	24.01%

A referendum on annexation by the French First Republic was held in the Rauracian Republic, a sister republic of France, between 4 and 7 March 1793. Of the 115 deputies meant to represent the voting results of their communities, only 41 reliable ones were admitted, who on the 7th confirmed the annexation to France as decided by the first two assemblies.

== Background ==
Following the proclamation in September 1792 of the French First Republic, unrest quickly spread in the lands of the Prince-Bishopric of Basel, which was occupied by French volunteer battalions. On November 27, 1792, the Council of Twenty-Four, a group of 23 former state councillors led by Josef Anton Rengger, declared itself the National Assembly, and on December 19, 1792, together with 122 elected representatives, proclaimed the Rauracian Republic, which consisted of the northern part of the former Prince-Bishopric. The southern part, which had legal ties to Switzerland, remained unoccupied.

The first assembly preferred annexation to France but was declared illegal by the French Foreign Minister as the drafting of a constitution had been lost in political battles. A second assembly convened on January 18, 1793, but was so divided that the French commissioners dissolved it. Finally, a third assembly was elected from March 4 to 6, which met on March 7 and only had to decide on annexation.

== Results ==
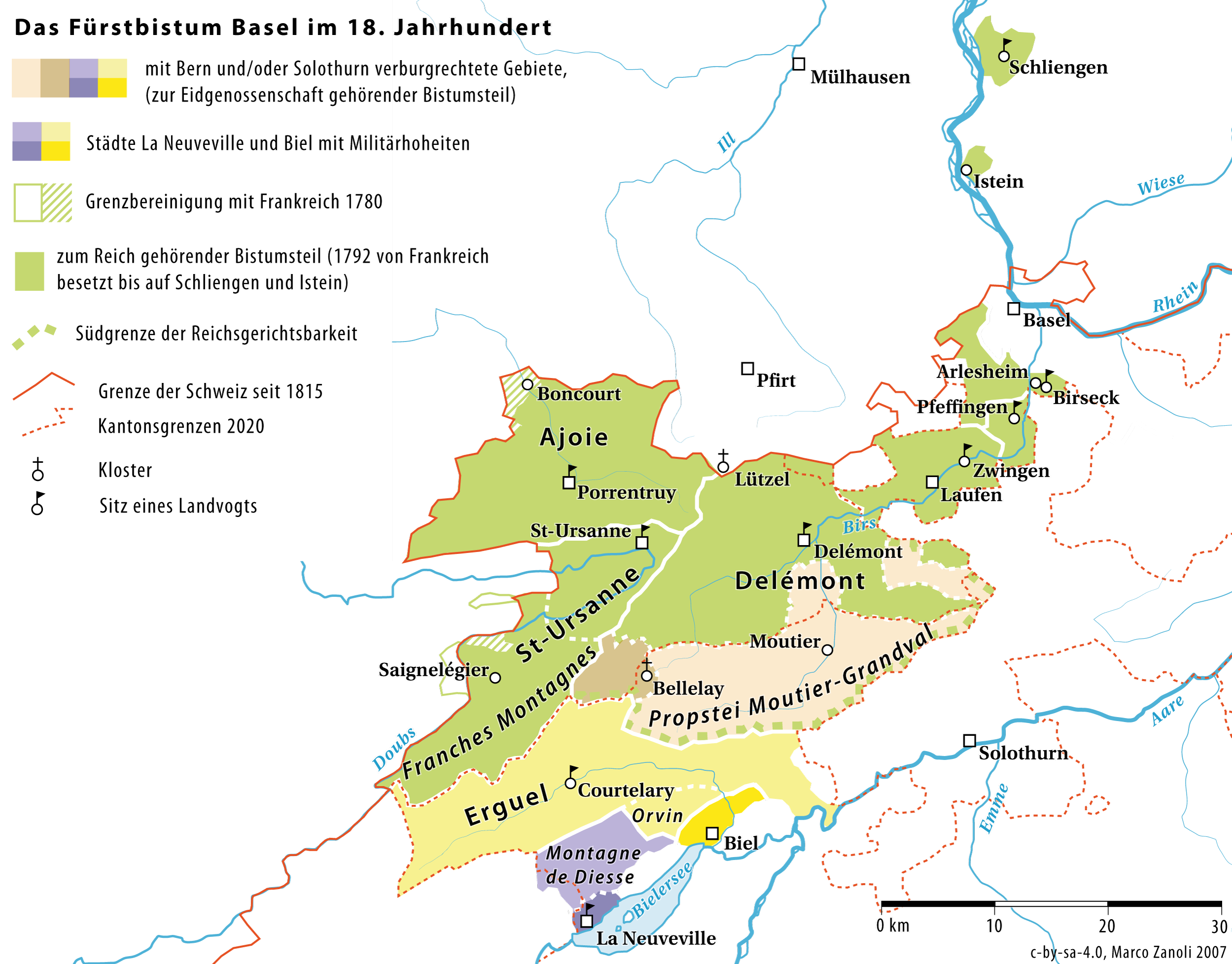
Map of the Prince-Bishopric of Basel in the 18th century

There was general male suffrage from the age of 21 and voting took place openly in general meetings. The representatives represented the voting results of their communities.

Votes from Laufental were declared invalid by French authorities as they set preconditions for the protection of religion. Birseck-Pfeffingen did not vote to join the union because it did not understand the French documents. The "yes" votes with reservations count as a "yes" because the French National Assembly complied with the request for a Mont-Terrible department.

Choice	Votes	%
Yes	990	51.70
Yes with reservations	865	45.17
No	60	3.13
Total	1,915	100.00
Valid votes	1,915	86.46
Invalid/blank votes	300	13.54
Total votes	2,215	100.00
Registered voters/turnout	9,225	24.01
Source: Database and Search Engine for Direct Democracy

=== Breakdown ===
Area	Yes		Yes with reservations		Yes total		No		Valid Votes	Rejected votes	Registered voters	Turnout %
Area	Votes	%	Votes	%	Votes	%	Votes	%	Valid Votes	Rejected votes	Registered voters	Turnout %
Porrentruy	50	18.87%	225	84.91%	265	100.00%	0	00.00%	265	0	525	50.48%
Bailliage (Ajoie)	140	25.93%	400	74.07%	540	100.00%	0	00.00%	540	0	2,400	22.50%
Delémont	0	00.00%	120	100.00%	120	100.00%	0	00.00%	120	0	250	48.00%
Bailliage (Delémont)	450	100.00%	0	00.00	450	100.00%	0	00.00%	450	0	1,850	24.32%
Saint-Ursanne	150	100.00%	0	00.00	150	100.00%	0	00.00%	150	0	500	30.00%
Franches-Montagnes	200	52.63%	120	31.58%	320	84.21%	60	15.79%	380	0	1,700	22.35%
Laufental	0	00.00%	0	00.00%	0	00.00%	0	00.00%	0	150	800	18.75%
Birseck-Pfeffingen	0	00.00%	0	00.00%	0	00.00%	0	00.00%	0	150	1,200	12.50%
Totals	990	51.70%	865	45.17%	1,855	96.87%	60	3.13%	1,915	300	9,225	24.00%

== Aftermath ==
Of the 115 deputies elected to represent the voting results of their communities, only 41 reliable ones were admitted, who on the following day promised the establishment of a separate administrative district and the recognition of the Catholic faith and, as decided in the original assemblies, confirmed annexation to France, which was interpreted as the "freely expressed wish of the sovereign people of Pruntrut". The National Convention finalized annexation on March 23 and, as desired, formed the new department of Mont-Terrible.

In 1815, the Congress of Vienna assigned the French-speaking areas and Laufental to the Canton of Bern, while Birseck was assigned to the Canton of Basel.
