= Rauracia =

Rauracia can be:

- the Rauraci, a group of Celts who settled in the Jura area of Switzerland around 400 BC
- the official anthem of the Swiss canton of Jura
- 113415 Rauracia, a minor planet discovered at the Jurassien-Vicques Observatory
- the Rauracian Republic, a short-lived (1792–1793) state that included parts of modern France and Switzerland around the Jura mountains
