= Duchy of Courland, Semigallia and Pilten =

Administrative body for Lithuania

Duchy of Courland, Semigallia and Pilten: Duché de Courlande, Semigallia et Piltene (French); Herzogtum Kurland, Semgallen und Pilten (German); Kurzemes, Zemgales un Piltenes hercogiste (Latvian)
- 1812
- Coat of arms

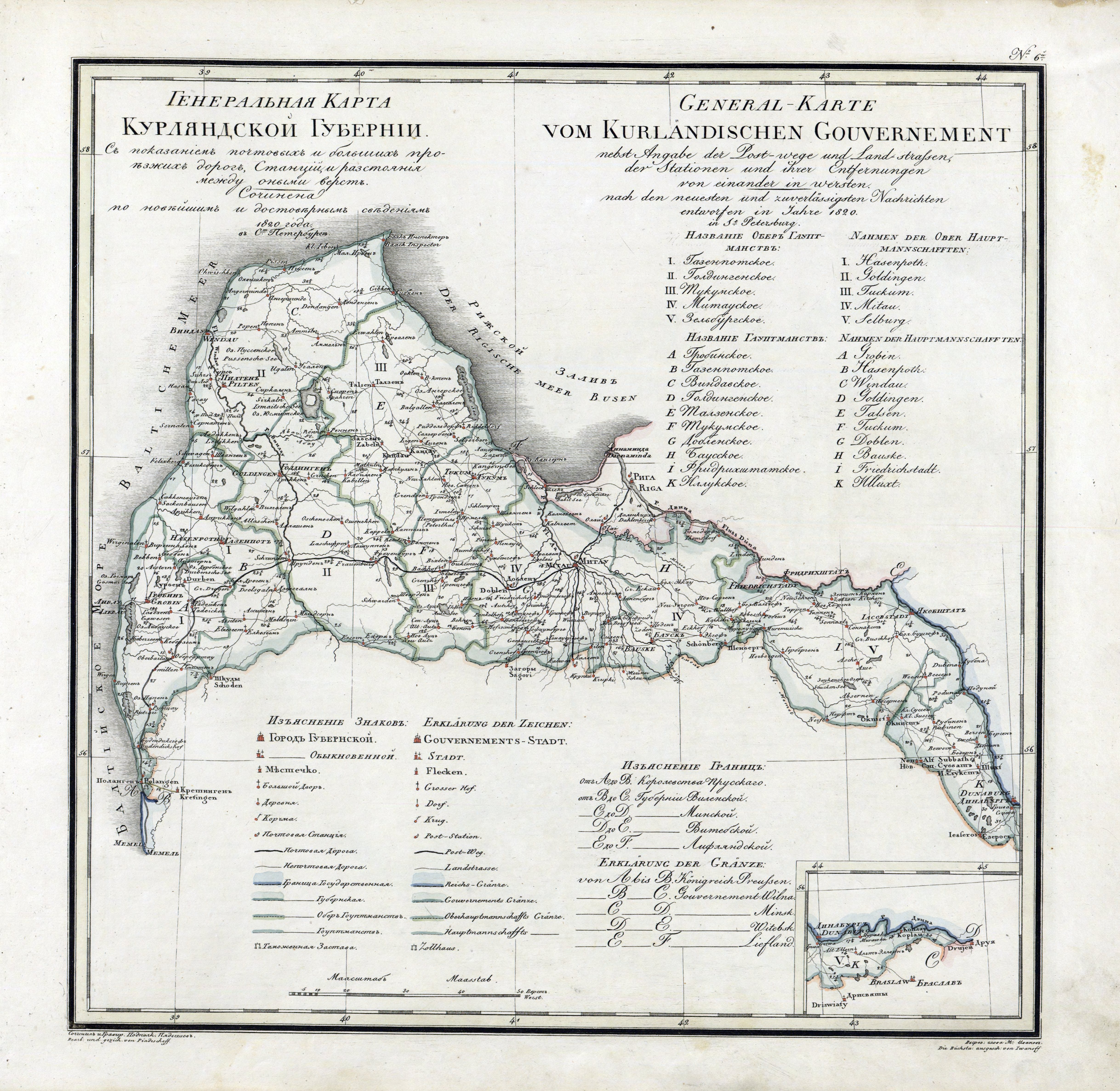
- Duchy of Courland, Semigallia and Pilten in green Map of Courland from 1820.
- Status: Short-lived client state of the French Empire
- Capital: Jelgava
- Common languages: German, Latvian, French
- Demonym: Curonian
- Governor-General
  - 1812: Jacques David Martin de Campredon
- Head of Government
  - 1812: Karl Johann Friedrich von Medem
- Historical era: Early modern period
  - Established: 1 August 1812
  - Disestablished: 20 December 1812
Preceded by	Succeeded by
Russian Empire	Russian Empire
- Today part of: Latvia

The Duchy of Courland, Semigallia and Pilten (Note: French: Duché de Courlande, Semigallia et Piltene; German: Herzogtum Kurland, Semgallen und Piltene; Latvian: Kurzemes, Zemgales un Piltenes hercogiste) was a short-lived client state of the First French Empire in the Baltics, mostly comprising Courland and Semigallia in modern-day Latvia. It was founded on 1 August 1812, during the French invasion of Russia, from the territory of the Courland Governorate, and existed until 20 December 1812. Its capital was set in Jelgava.

== History ==
On 19 June 1812, during the French invasion of Russia, the territories of modern-day Belarus and Lithuania were occupied by French troops, and the client state of the Grand Duchy of Lithuania was formed. On 9 July 1812, emperor Napoleon Bonaparte declared in Vilnius his intention of restoring historical Duchy of Courland and Semigallia and the Duchy of Livonia. On 18 July, the 10th Corps of the Grand Army, commanded by marshal Étienne Macdonald, occupied the town of Bauska. The next day, France defeated Russia in the Battle of Ekau. By 20 July, the administration of the Russian Courland Governorate, including its governor Friedrich Wilhelm von Sivers, had fled the territory.

On 1 August 1812, a decree was issued, announcing the formation of the Duchy of Courland, Semigallia and Pilten. With its capital in Jelgava, it included some of the boundaries of the former governorate. Karl Johann Friedrich von Medem was elected as the head of government, with Diedrich Ernst von Schöppingk and Wilhelm Rüdiger becoming his advisers, and Georg Benedict von Engelhardt being appointed the prosecutor. On 26 August, by the order of Hugues-Bernard Maret, French consulates were established in Jelgava and Liepāja. On 8 October, general Jacques David Martin de Campredon was appointed as the Governor-General of Courland.

On 28 November, marshal Macdonald received news of the retreat of Napoleon's main forces from Russia and ordered his troops to withdraw from Courland. He himself left on 5 December, while the French-appointed officials left on 7 December. The state ceased to exist on 20 December, with the departure of the French forces. Its territory was reincorporated into Russia as the Courland Governorate.

== Regency council ==
Published on 1 August 1812, the Arreté organique des pays formant la Province de Courlande et Ia Semigalle (Organic Decree concerning the countries forming the Province of Courland and Semigallia) outlined the administrative structure of the new provisional government, which was referred to as a regency council.

The regency council consisted of the following positions:

- Intendants of Courland,
- President of the Regency,
- Councillors of the Regency,
- Assessor of the Regency,
- Secretary of the Regency.

The intendants of Courland, Jules de Chambaudoin and Charles de Montigny, were both auditors in the Council of State. De Chambaudoin represented Upper Courland (Mitau or Jelgava), and de Montigny, Lower Courland (Goldingen, Tuckum, and Pilten). As intendants, they organized the provisional government in accordance to Napoleon's wishes, and were signatories to the decree. The regency council was not permitted to make decisions without their approval.

Additionally, the new government was tasked with supporting French forces during their campaigns in Russia. French Army commanders within the occupied territories also had significant power, as enshrined by the decree.

== Economy and society ==
Under the occupation, Curonian government authorities had to pay tax (and donate supplies to) the French and Prussian armies. In addition, a sizeable percentage of young males were farm laborers, and most were multilingual, commonly speaking Latvian, German or Russian. Two imperial Russian institutions, the high court and medical authority, were retained in 1812.
