= Jacques David Martin de Campredon =

French politician (1761–1837)

Jacques David Martin Baron de Campredon
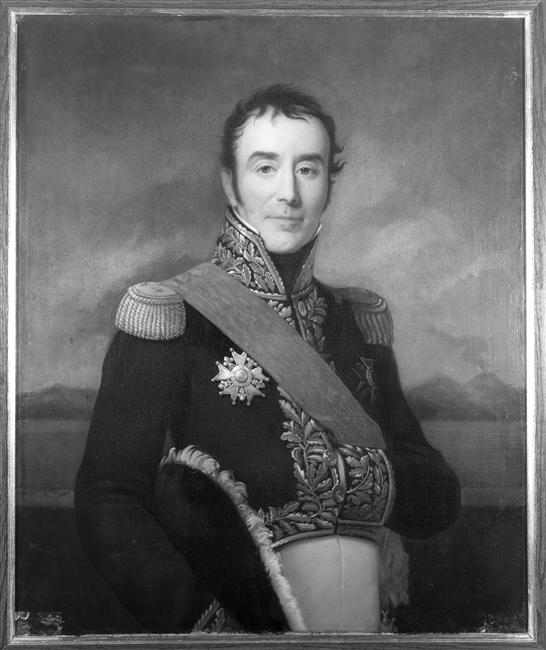

Governor-general of Courland
- In office 1812
- Monarch: Napoleon I

Personal details
- Born: 13 January 1761 Montpellier, France
- Died: 11 April 1837 (aged 76) Montpellier, France
- Military career
- Allegiance: Kingdom of France; French First Republic; First French Empire; Kingdom of Naples
- Branch: French Army; Neapolitan Army
- Service years: 1782–1814
- Rank: Général de division
- Commands: Engineers of the Army of Italy; Engineers of the X Corps
- Conflicts: War of the First Coalition; Italian campaign; Fall of the Venetian Republic; War of the Second Coalition; Siege of Gaeta; Napoleonic Wars; French invasion of Russia; Siege of Riga; War of the Sixth Coalition; Siege of Danzig (WIA) (POW)
- Awards: Grand Cross of the Legion of Honour; Order of Military Merit
- Other work: Minister of War of the Kingdom of Naples

Baron Jacques David Martin de Campredon (13 January 1761 – 11 April 1837) was a French army officer during the Napoleonic Wars. He was minister of war of the Kingdom of Naples in 1809, and governor-general of Courland in 1812.

He became a Peer of France in 1835, during the July Monarchy. His name is inscribed on the Arc de Triomphe.

== Early life and education ==
Jacques David Martin Campredon was born on 13 January 1761 in Montpellier, Kingdom of France. His father, an assistant to the king, made his family wealthy and successful, and Campredon obtained a quality education as a result.

== Military service ==
After graduating from engineering school, Campredon was commissioned as a sous-lieutenant in January 1782. Promoted to full lieutenant in 1785, he was married in 1790 to the sister of another engineer officer. In April 1791 Campredon became a captain, and served as an aide-de-camp to various generals. In 1794 he taught engineering in schools, and by October 1795 had accepted the rank of Chef de bataillon, alongside the title "deputy director of fortifications".

In April 1796 he was attached to Napoleon Bonaparte's Army of Italy, wherein he became chief of engineering for the entire field army. He participated in the Fall of the Venetian Republic during the Italian campaign, and later fought in the Battle of Genola during the War of the Second Coalition. He received a battlefield promotion at Genola, becoming a Général de brigade.

Campredon co-directed the Siege of Gaeta in 1806, being congratulated by Napoleon afterwards. In August, he was promoted to Général de division. He was then transferred to the Royal Neapolitan Army, although retained command of all French engineers in Naples. Upon its creation in 1808, he was awarded the Royal Order of the Two-Sicilies. He served as the kingdom's minister of war, briefly, in November 1809.

Personal arms of de Campredon

Campredon was recalled to French service for the invasion of Russia in 1812, becoming chief of the engineers for Marshal MacDonald's X Corps. He directed the Siege of Riga, and after withdrawing into captured Livonia, was named governor-general of the new French-occupied territory (the Duchy of Courland, Semigallia and Pilten). After the dissolution of occupied Courland, Campredon became commander of the engineers in Danzig. He was wounded defending the city during its besiegement, and became a prisoner of war of the Russians when the battle was lost.

Campredon was freed when Napoleon abdicated in 1814, and he returned to France to be of service to the Bourbon Restoration. He was inducted into the Order of Military Merit, named a Grand-Cross recipient of the Legion of Honour, and inspector-general of the engineers. He was also made a Baron in the reformed peerage, a reconfirmation of the noble title he held under Napoleon.

== Later years and death ==
Louis Philippe I appointed Campredon to the Chamber of Peers on 11 September 1835, but the latter's political career would be short-lived. Campredon died in the city of his birth, Montpellier, on 11 April 1837.
