= Republic of Brescia =

Temporary French client republic in Italy

Republic of Brescia Repubblica bresciana
- 1797–1797
- Status: Client state of France
- Capital: Brescia
- Common languages: Italian
- Government: Republic
- Historical era: French Revolutionary Wars
  - Established: 18 March 1797
  - Annexation into Cisalpine Republic: 20 November 1797
| Preceded by | Succeeded by |
| Domini di Terraferma | Cisalpine Republic |
- Today part of: Italy

The Republic of Brescia (Italian: Repubblica bresciana) was a temporary French client republic in Italy. Established March 18, 1797, in the wake of the French occupation of Brescia and Bergamo, it became part of the Cisalpine Republic on November 20, 1797.

== See also ==
- Fall of the Republic of Venice
- Republic of Bergamo
