= Sister republic =

Client state of France during the French Revolutionary Wars

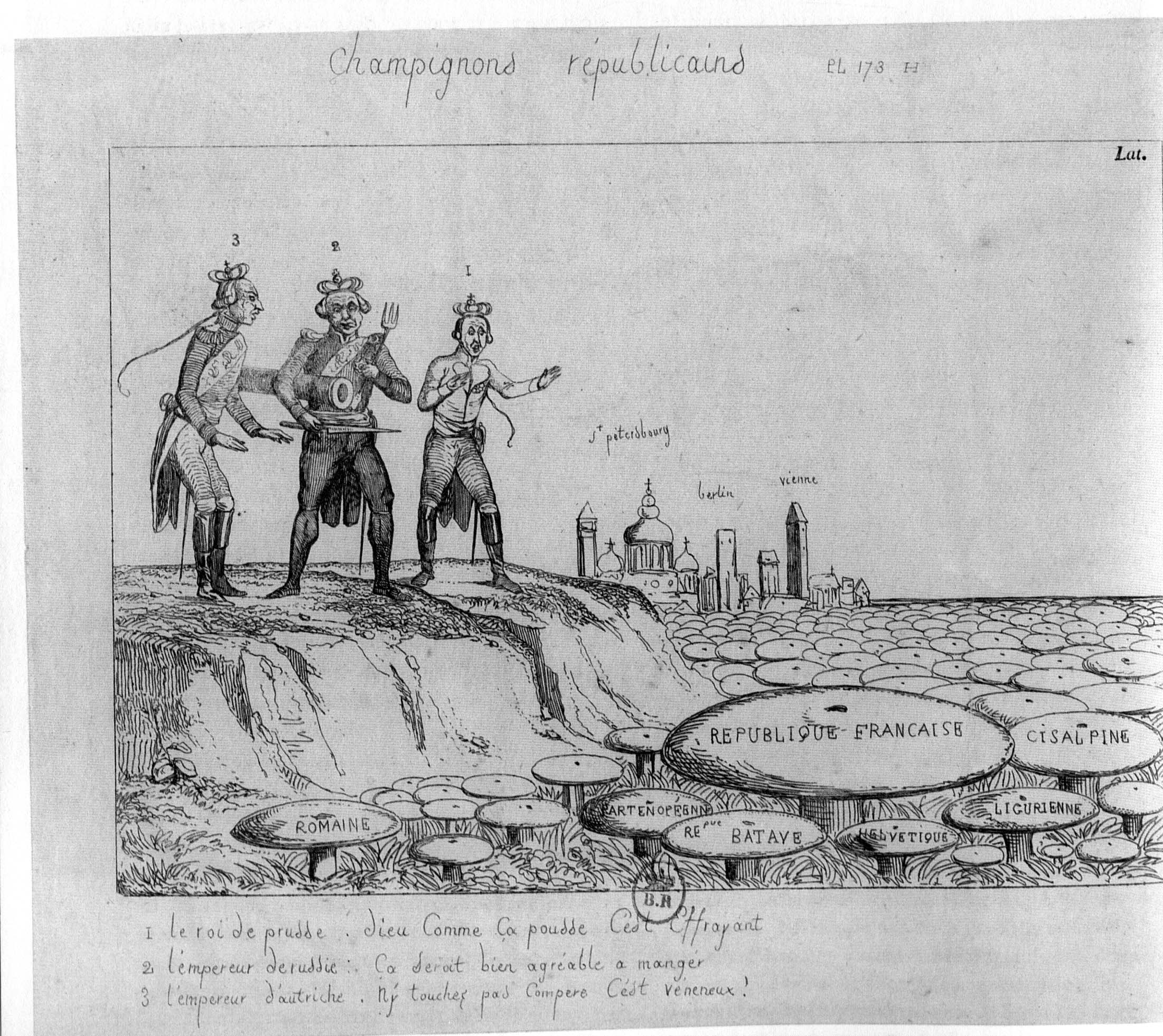
1799 cartoon showing the Prussian, Russian and Austrian monarchs watching as a mushroom field of sister republics sprouts up

Sister republics (French: république sœur, pronounced [ʁepyblik sœʁ]) were satellite states of the French Republic set up in the territories captured by the victorious French Army during the French Revolutionary Wars; like their protector, they were revolutionary republics. This became particularly evident after the First French Empire was established in 1804, after which France annexed several sister republics and transformed the remainder into monarchies ruled by members of the House of Bonaparte.

== History ==
The French Revolution was a period of social and political upheaval in France from 1789 until 1799. The Republicans who overthrew the monarchy were driven by ideas of popular sovereignty, rule of law, and representative democracy. The Republicans borrowed ideas and values from Whiggism and Enlightenment philosophers. The French Republic supported the spread of republican principles in Europe. According to Paul D. Van Wie, most of these sister republics became a means of controlling occupied lands as client regimes through a mix of French and local power.

== List of Sister Republics ==
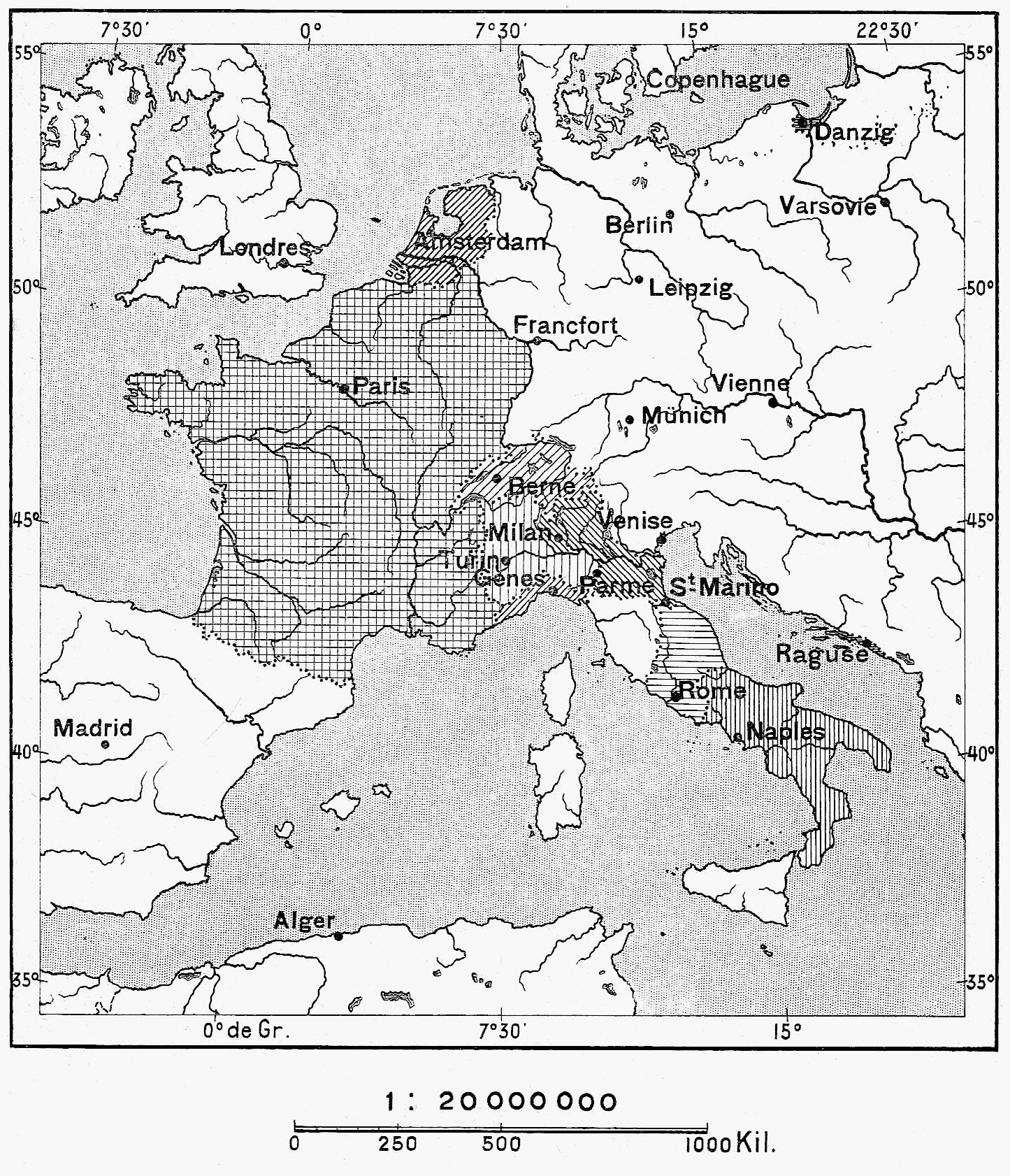
Map of France and its sister republics in 1798

| Flag | Name | Duration | Location | Fate |
|---|---|---|---|---|
| | Subalpine Republic | 1800–1802 | Piedmont | Annexed by the French Republic. |
| | Piedmontese Republic | 1798–1799 | Piedmont | Predecessor to the Subalpine Republic. Conquered by Austro-Russian troops, later reconquered by Napoleon. |
| | Republic of Alba | 1796 (26 April-28 April) | Alba | Predecessor to the Piedmontese Republic; reconquered by the Kingdom of Sardinia. |
| Parthenopaean Republic | Parthenopean Republic | 1799 (21 January-13 June) | Naples | Reconquered by the Sanfedisti for the King of Naples and Sicily. |
| | Republic of Pescara | 1799 (? January-30 June) [a part of Parthenopean Republic] | Pescara | Reunited with the Kingdom of Naples. |
| Repubblica Romana 1798 | Roman Republic | 1798–1799 | Papal States | Ended with the restoration of the Papal States. |
| Repubblica Anconitana | Anconine Republic | 1797–1798 | Ancona | Joined the Roman Republic. |
| France | Tiberina Republic | 1798 (4 February-7 March) | Perugia | Joined the Roman Republic. |
| Genoa | Ligurian Republic | 1797–1805 | Genoa | Annexed by the French Empire. |
| | Republic of Lucca | 1799 (22 January-17 July); 1800–1805 | Lucca | Replaced by the Principality of Lucca and Piombino. |
| | Italian Republic (Napoleonic) | 1802–1805 | Northern Italy | Transformed into the Kingdom of Italy (Napoleonic). |
| Repubblica Cisalpina | Cisalpine Republic | 1797–1802 | Northern Italy | Transformed into the Italian Republic. |
| | Cispadane Republic | 1796–1797 | Emilia-Romagna | Merged with the Transpadane Republic to form the Cisalpine Republic. |
| | Bolognese Republic | 1796 (23 June-16 October) | Bologna | Annexed by the Cispadane Republic. |
| Repubblica Transpadana | Transpadane Republic | 1796–1797 | Lombardy | Merged with the Cispadane Republic to form the Cisalpine Republic. |
| | Republic of Crema | 1797 (28 March-10 July) | Crema | Annexed by the Cisalpine Republic. |
| | Republic of Bergamo | 1797 (13 March -29 June) | Bergamo | Annexed by the Cisalpine Republic. |
| | Republic of Brescia | 1797 (18 March-20 November) | Brescia | Annexed by the Cisalpine Republic. |
| | Provisional Municipality of Venice | 1797–1798 | Venice | Ceded to the Austrian Empire by the Treaty of Campo Formio. |
| | Republic of Bouillon | 1794–1795 | Bouillon (modern-day Belgium) | Annexed by the French Republic. |
| | Republic of Liège | 1789–1791 | Prince-Bishopric of Liège (modern-day Belgium) | Dissolved after restoration of the Prince-Bishopric; later annexed by France. |
| | Rauracian Republic | 1792–1793 | Basel (modern-day Switzerland) | Annexed by the French Republic. |
| | Lémanique Republic | 1798 (24 January -12 February) | Vaud (modern-day Switzerland) | Joined the Helvetic Republic as the Canton of Léman. |
| | Republic of Mainz | 1793 (18 March-22 June) | Rhenish Hesse and Palatinate (modern-day Germany) | Collapsed upon the Prussian reconquest of Mainz. |
| | Batavian Republic | 1795–1806 (1795-1801 Batavian Republic; 1801-1806 Batavian Commonwealth) | Netherlands | Replaced by the Kingdom of Holland. |
| | Cisrhenian Republic | 1797-1801 | West bank of the Rhine (modern-day Germany) | Proclaimed but not fully established; area annexed by France. |
| | Irish Republic (1798) | 1798 (22 August-23 September) | Connacht (Ireland) | Proclaimed during the Irish Rebellion of 1798; collapsed with the defeat of the Franco-Irish force. |
| | Helvetic Republic | 1798–1803 | Switzerland | Dissolved by Napoleon's Act of Mediation. |
| | Altamura | 1799 (8 February-31 May) | Altamura (Kingdom of Naples) | Crushed by Neapolitan royalist forces (the Sanfedisti). |
| | Astese Republic | 1797 (28 July-30 July) | Asti | Short-lived, suppressed and absorbed by the Cisalpine Republic. |
| | Reggiana Republic | 1796 (26 August -22 October) | Reggio Emilia | Annexed by the Cispadane Republic. |
| | Rhodanic Republic | 1798 (16 March-1 May); 1802–1810 | Valais (modern-day Switzerland) | Transformed into the Republic of Valais under French influence, later annexed. |

== See also ==
- List of French client states
- Exporting the revolution
  - Cuban military internationalism
  - Empire of Liberty, theme in American foreign policy
  - Exporting the Islamic Revolution, foreign policy of Iran
  - World revolution, concept in Marxism
