= Republic of Crema =

European polity

Republic of Crema Republega Cremasca (Lombard)
- 1797
- Flag Coat of arms
- Status: Client state of France
- Capital: Crema
- Common languages: Lombard
- Religion: Roman Catholicism
- Government: Republic
- Historical era: French Revolutionary Wars
  - Established: 28 March 1797
  - Amalgamated Into the Cisalpine Republic: 10 July 1797
Preceded by	Succeeded by
Domini di Terraferma	Cisalpine Republic
- Today part of: Italy

The Republic of Crema (Lombard: Republega Cremasca; Italian: Repubblica Cremasca) was a revolutionary municipality in Lombardy, which was created when the French Revolutionary Army entered Crema on 28 March 1797.

It ruled the local affairs of the city and its environs, which previously were a Venetian exclave in the Duchy of Milan. The municipality entered then into the Cisalpine Republic in July 1797.

== History ==
The city of Crema and its surroundings had been annexed by the Republic of Venice since 1449, and had been ruled by a Venetian podestà for more than three centuries. On 28 March 1797, a troop of French Revolutionary Army dragoons entered and occupied the city without facing any resistance and arrested the last Venetian magistrate, the duke Zan Battista Contarini.

A new municipality was formed to control the city, which was composed mostly of small landowners and local nobles. They proclaimed the new Republic of Crema, that had the control of the town and the territories previously belonging to the province of Crema.

The small revolutionary republic had a short life. Three months later, on 29 July 1797, its territory merged with the Cisalpine Republic and legally annexed to it on the base of the Treaty of Campo Formio, becoming part of the Adda department and later on the Alto Po one.

Nowadays, the territory of the former Republic of Crema goes from the municipality of Spino d'Adda (east) to the Castelleone one.

== Flag and coat of arms ==
Flag of the Republic

The republic used a simple white flag with the coat of arms.
