= Republic of Bergamo =

Short-lived French client republic

Coordinates: 45°42′19.7″N 9°40′40.3″E

The Republic of Bergamo (Italian: Repubblica Bergamasca) was an ephemeral revolutionary client republic, created on 13 March 1797 by the French army to rule the local administration of Bergamo and its province, during the dissolution of the Republic of Venice. With the Preliminary of Leoben, France and Austria agreed the end of the multi-centennial Venetian rule over the territory between Adda River and Oglio River, together with the Austrian occupation of Istria and Dalmatia.

Defined as "mother-municipality", the administration of the city of Bergamo had to help the creation of "dependent-municipalities" in all the surrounding county. The Republic so became one of the constituent countries of the Cisalpine Republic, established on 29 June 1797.

== Establishment of the Revolutionary Republic ==
The French troops under General Bareguey entered Bergamo on Christmas Day of 1796, without a fight, according to the Venetian podestà, Count Ottolini, who had agreed to the withdrawal of the Venetian troops.

On 12 March 1797 was proclaimed the Republic of Bergamo. Ottolini, threatened with arrest, left for Brescia, while the new municipality was being elected, consisting of 24 persons, who also established a semblance of an army.

Two days later the Republic voted to be annexed to the Cispadane Republic, and the arms of Venice were removed from the doors of the Venetian walls. The tree of liberty was erected in Piazza Vecchia, as well as in the districts.

== The Constitution of 24 March ==
On 24 March the Constitution of the Republic of Bergamo was approved.

The new administration included the division of territory into cantons supra. Every territory that wanted to become a town, should have reunited its citizens in a church, under the authority of the priest, and they named a congressman. These, together with the other congressmen of the towns of Cantone, nominated three permanent members of the municipalities of the cantone. Once convened in Bergamo, they should indicate their acceptance of new administrative bodies, bringing the list of representatives of municipalities. The Municipality of Bergamo was formed by twenty-four states.

On 17 April 1797, wheat rallies general, men with power to vote in every church gathered to elect their representatives.

== Subdivision of land ==
The republic was divided into 14 cantons, which were divided into towns:

- City of Bergamo
- Canton of Almenno
- Canton of Alzano
- Canton of Calepio
- Canton of Caprino
- Canton of Clusone
- Canton of Endine
- Canton of Gandino
- Canton of Martinengo or Bolgare; Calcinate; Cavernago; Cividate; Cortenuova; Fara Olivana; Ghisalba; Malpaga; Martinengo; Mornico; Palosco; Romano Telgate
- Canton of Piazza
- Canton of Ponte
- Canton of Seriate
- Canton of Verdello or Albegno; Arcene; Bariano; Boltiere; Ciserano; Cologno; Colognola; Comun Nuovo; Curnasco; Grumello del Piano; Lallio, Levate, Lurano, Mariano, Morengo; Osio Sopra, Osio Sotto; Pognano; Sabbio; Sforzatica; Sforzatica di Oleno; Spirano; Stezzano, Treviolo; Verdello Minore; Urgnano; Verdello
- Canton of Vilminore
- Canton of Zogno

== The counter-revolution in the valleys ==
In the valleys, and especially in Imagna Valley, however, took the form a sort of counter-revolution: the Republic appeared to be anti-religious, and especially in the countries of the charisma of the clergy could keep the population from the Venetians. The revolt was quelled, however, within a month

In this area also began to circulate the tale of the exploits of Pacì Paciana the brigand.

== Disestablishment ==
With the Treaty of Campo Formio, after about three months after its establishment, the Republic of Bergamo then entered a part of the Cisalpine Republic as Department of Serio.

== See also ==
- Fall of the Republic of Venice
- French client republic
- Transpadane Republic
- Cisalpine Republic

== Sources ==
- Bortolo Belotti, Banca Popolare di Bergamo, Storia di Bergamo e dei bergamaschi, Volume 6, Storia di Bergamo e dei bergamaschi
- Bortolo Belotti, Edizioni Bolis, 1989, the University of Virginia, 11 Mar
