= Rauracian Republic =

French client state (1792–1793)

Rauracian Republic République rauracienne
- 1792–1793
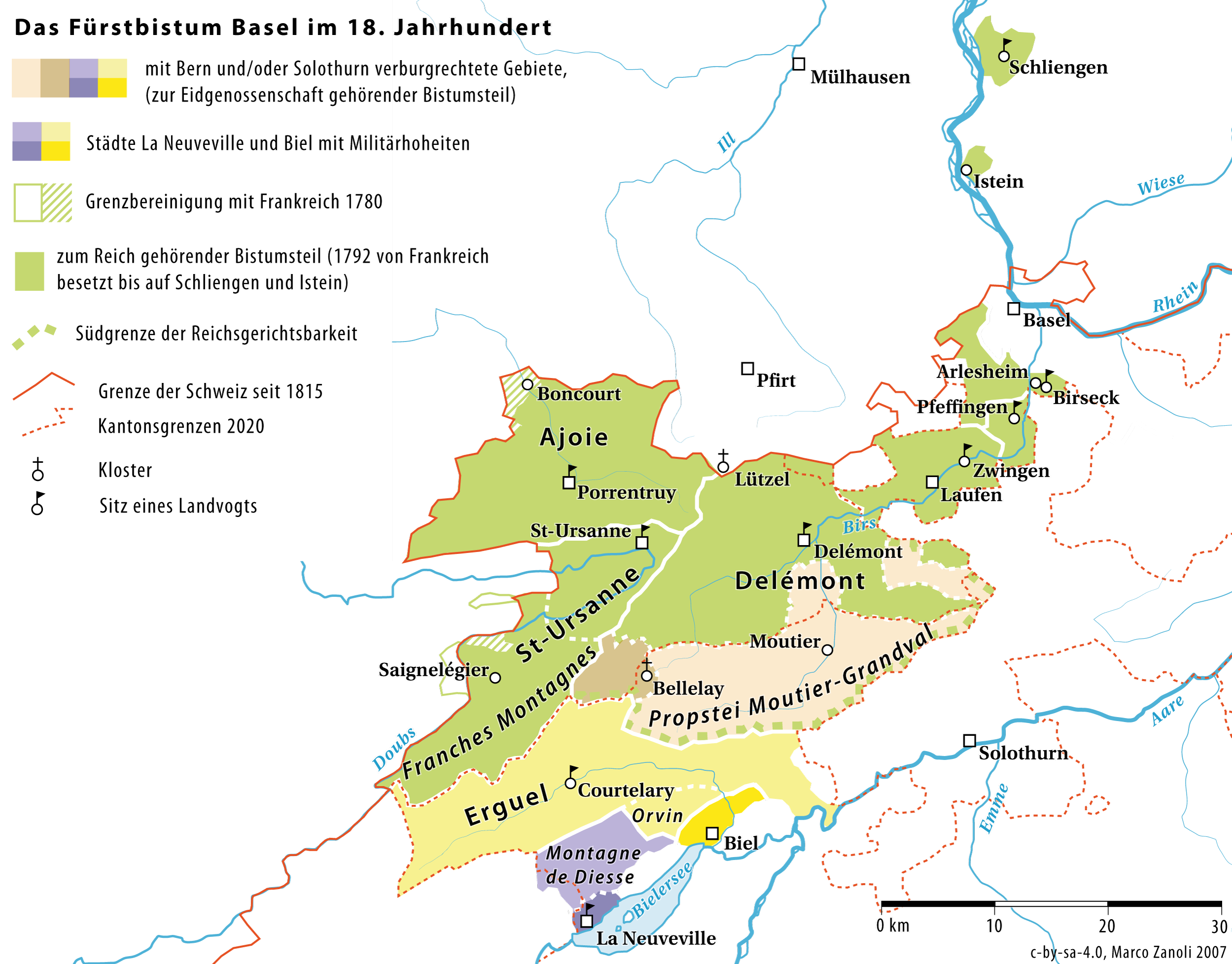
- Map of the Prince-Bishopric of Basel in the 18th century
- Status: Client state of France
- Government: Republic
- Historical era: French Revolution
  - Republic proclaimed: 17 December 1792
  - Integration into France: 23 March 1793
Preceded by	Succeeded by
Prince-Bishopric of Basel	Mont-Terrible

The Rauracian Republic was a short-lived French occupation zone that included parts of modern Switzerland around the Jura Mountains. It was created from the northern portion of the Prince-Bishopric of Basel, which was part of the Holy Roman Empire.

The Rauracian Republic existed for just a few months. It was inaugurated on 17 December 1792 and absorbed into France on 23 March 1793. Twenty-two years later, in 1815, Basel and Bern divided the territory of the former republic between them.

The name of the Republic was taken from the Latin name of an ancient Celtic tribe, the Raurici, who settled the southern part of the Upper Rhine. The Raurici were related to the Helvetii, whose name was later bestowed on another French client state, the Helvetic Republic.

== Chronology ==
Following the proclamation in September 1792 of the French First Republic, unrest quickly spread in the lands of the Prince-Bishop of Basel, leading to the creation of "revolutionary committees". On 17 December 1792, the Rauracian Republic was proclaimed as the first "sister republic" of revolutionary France. Following the successive collapses of two national assemblies, a third voted for incorporation into France, backed by a referendum believed to have been supported by French pressure and manipulation. This was achieved on 23 March 1793 with the creation of the French Department of Mont-Terrible which had its capital at Porrentruy.

Administrative frontiers changed more than once in the ensuring two decades, but when the war finally came to an end, the territory of Mont-Terrible, previously the Rauracian Republic, was divided by the victorious powers at the Congress of Vienna between the cantons of Bern and Basel.

Unlike other "Sister republics" of France, the Rauracian Republic seems never to have acquired a national flag. It did, however, adopt a coat of arms. In essence, this portrayed the old Lictors' Bundle which had been a favoured symbol of authority under the old Roman Republic and which still appears in the seal of the French state and on the cantonal shield of St. Gallen.
