= Transpadane Republic =

Former country in Europe

Coordinates: 45°28′N 09°10′E

Transpadane Republic Repubblica Transpadana (Italian)
- 1796–1797
- Flag of Transpadane Republic

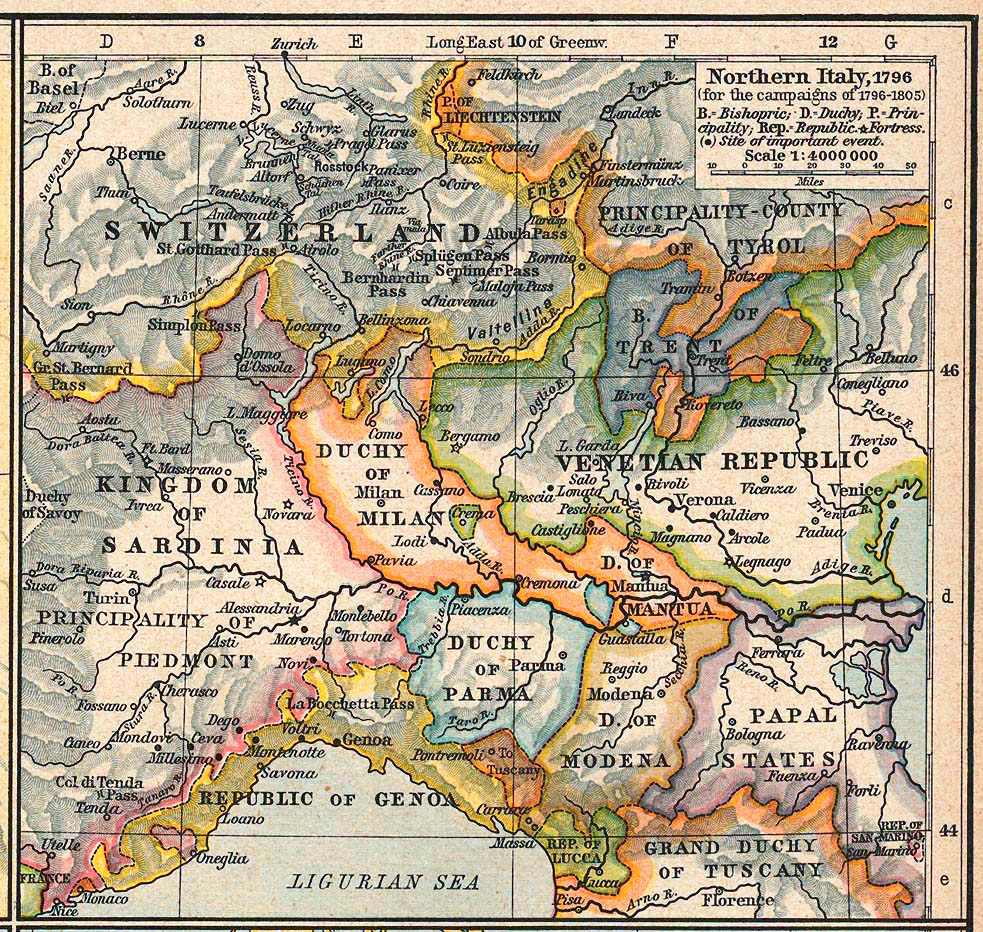
- Northern Italy in 1796. The Duchy of Milan became the Transpadane Republic after the French occupation of 1796.
- Status: Sister Republic of France
- Capital: Milan
- Government: Provisional republic
- Historical era: Napoleonic Era
  - Battle of Lodi: 10 May 1796
  - Proclaimed by Napoleon: 21 May 1796
  - Proclamation of the Cisalpine Republic: 29 June 1797
Preceded by	Succeeded by
Duchy of Milan	Cisalpine Republic

The Transpadane Republic (Italian: Repubblica Transpadana) was a sister republic of France established in Milan from 1796 to 1797.

== History ==
On 10 May 1796, the French army defeated the Austrian troops in the Battle of Lodi, and occupied the Duchy of Milan. Napoleon set up a temporary authority, the General Administration of Lombardy, which replaced the Austrian administration and created a French client republic in Northern Italy, adopting the French Republican calendar. Transpadane indicates "across the Po (river)," with the corresponding Cispadane Republic indicating "on this side of the Po."

The administration was granted full civil powers by a proclamation of Napoleon on Brumaire 8, year V (29 October 1796), although its orders had to be approved by the French military commander of Lombardy. The administration was composed of four departments: religious and cultural affairs, transportation and engineering affairs, financial and tax affairs, and mercantile and commercial affairs.

After the new victories of Napoleon's army, the territory of the republic grew; with the Peace of Leoben on 17 April 1797, France invaded the Republic of Venice, conquering Bergamo and moving eastwards from the Adda River to the Oglio River, the Venetian demarcation line established more than three centuries earlier. On 19 May, Napoleon transferred to Milan the territories of the former Duchy of Modena from the bordering Cispadane Republic. On 29 June, he decided to give the republic a final arrangement: by his own decree, he proclaimed the birth of the Cisalpine Republic.

== Sources ==
- Historical database of Lombard laws (in Italian)
