= Timeline of geopolitical changes (1500–1899) =

- Timeline of geopolitical changes (before 1500); Timeline of geopolitical changes (1500–1899); Timeline of geopolitical changes (1900–1999); Timeline of geopolitical changes (2000–present)

This is a timeline of geopolitical changes around the world between 1500 and 1899. It includes dates of declarations of independence, changes in country name, changes of capital city or name, and changes in territorial ownership such as the annexation, occupation, cession, concession, or secession of land. Territorial conquests as a result of war are included on the timeline at the conclusion of major military campaigns, but changes in the course of specific battles and day-to-day operations are generally not included.

== 16th century ==
Year	Date	Event
1500	22 April	Portuguese navigator Pedro Álvares Cabral arrives at the coast of Brazil and claims all land in South America east of the Tordesillas Meridian for the Kingdom of Portugal, thus establishing the Portuguese Colony of Brazil.
1500		The Kingdom of Portugal conquers Mombasa.
1501		João da Nova discovers Ascension Island.
1501		The Wadai Sultanate is established.
1501		The Uzbek Khanate is disestablished.
1502		The Golden Horde is disestablished following the death of Shaykh Ahmad.
1503		The Aceh Sultanate is established. Kutaraja is the capital.
1504		The Kingdom of Naples is ceded to the Crown of Aragon.
1505		The colony of Portuguese India is established. Kochi is the capital.
1506		Fall of the Timurid Empire. The Khanate of Bukhara is created from areas of the former empire. Samarkand is the capital.
1506		The Delhi Sultanate moves its capital from Delhi to Agra.
1507		The Kingdom of Portugal conquers Muscat.
1507		The Portuguese Empire captures the island of Socrota from Mahra Sultanate with a fleet of 14 ships in the Battle of Socrota. The colony Portuguese Socotra is established and Suq is its capital.
1510		The Kingdom of Portugal conquers Goa.
1510		The Grand Duchy of Moscow annexes the Pskov Republic.
1511		The Khanate of Khiva is established in Central Asia. Old Urgench is the capital.
1511		The Kingdom of Portugal conquers Malacca.
1511		Portuguese Socrota is abandoned and the Mahra Sultanate retakes control of the island of Socrota.
1513		Juan Ponce de León claims Florida for Spain.
1514		The Principality of Moldavia becomes a vassal state of the Ottoman Empire.
1515		Algeria becomes a vassal state of the Ottoman Empire as the Regency of Algiers.
1517		The Ottoman Empire conquers Egypt from the Mamluks.
1517		Fall of the Majapahit Empire in Indonesia.
1520		The Sultanate of Maguindanao is established.
1521	13 August	The combined forces of Hernán Cortés conquer Tenochtitlan, capital of the Aztec Empire. The Kingdom of Spain subsequently renames the region Viceroyalty of New Spain. The destroyed capital is rebuilt and renamed México.
1521		Mayadunne establishes the Kingdom of Sitawaka in Sri Lanka from the Sinhala Kingdom at Kotte. Sitawaka is the capital.
1521		A combined Portuguese-Hormuz force led by António Correia conquered Bahrain but briefly lost it to the princes of Al-Hasa the same year. In response, the Portuguese sent another expedition to Bahrain and the Arabian coast to subdue the Al-Hasa and stop their attempts to regain power.
1522		Ferdinand Magellan circumnavigates the Earth.
1523		The Kalmar Union is dissolved.
1525	14 January	The Teutonic Order relinquishes its rights over its autonomous Livonian Order.
1525	10 April	The Duchy of Prussia emerges from the State of the Teutonic Order. Königsberg is the capital.
1526		Babur defeats the sultan of Delhi, establishing the Mughal Empire. Agra is the capital.
1526		Archduke Ferdinand of Austria is elected the next King of Bohemia and Hungary following the death of Louis II of Hungary and Bohemia, ruling the lands which would come to be known as the Habsburg monarchy.
1526		After the Battle of Mohács, large parts of Hungary and Croatia fall to the Ottoman Empire.
1527		Thái Tổ establishes the Mạc dynasty in Vietnam.
1527		The Kingdom of Croatia is established as part of the Habsburg monarchy. Zagreb is the capital.
1527		The Bahmani Sultanate is dissolved.
1528		The County of Lippe is established from the Lordship of Lippe. Detmold is the capital.
1529	22 April	Representatives of the Kingdom of Portugal and the Kingdom of Spain sign the Treaty of Zaragoza, settling each nation's legal boundary of conquest in Asia and Oceania at a meridian c. 144°40' west of Greenwich.
1529	26 July	Spain creates the Governorate of New Castile and New Toledo in South America with the Capitulation of Toledo.
1529	14 October	The First Siege of Vienna by the Ottoman Empire fails.
1530	26 October	The Order of Saint John annexes Malta and moves the capital from Mdina to Birgu.
1530		The Duchy of Mantua is established in northern Italy. Mantua is the capital.
1532		The Kingdom of France annexes the Duchy of Brittany.
1532		The Duchy of Florence replaces the Republic of Florence. Florence remains the capital.
1533	15 November	Francisco Pizarro leads an army into Cuzco, completing the Spanish conquest of the Inca Empire.
1533		The Later Lê dynasty in Vietnam is restored under Trang Tông.
1534		The Kingdom of Portugal divides its Colony of Brazil into 15 independent captaincies.
1534		Spain creates via capitulations the Governorate of New Andalusia and New León in South America.
1534		The colony of New France is established in North America.
1534		The Ottoman Empire conquers Baghdad from the Safavids.
1537		Denmark-Norway emerges as a dual monarchy after the withdrawal of the Kingdom of Sweden from the Kalmar Union.
1536		King Ferdinand I moves the capital of the Hungarian Kingdom to Pozsony.
1539	24 January	Spain claims the territories to the south of the Strait of Magellan creating the Governorate of Terra Australis.
1540		Sher Shah Suri establishes the Sur Empire, which dominates northern India and follows the Mughal Empire. Sasaram is the capital.
1542		The Kingdom of Ireland supersedes the feudal Lordship of Ireland.
1542		The Kingdom of England annexes the Principality of Wales.
1542		The Viceroyalty of Peru is established as an overseas territory of Spain.
1545		The Trịnh lords establish de facto control over northern Vietnam.
1545		The Duchy of Parma is established from parts of the Duchy of Milan.
1547		Ivan the Terrible proclaims the Tsardom of Russia, which follows the Grand Duchy of Moscow. Moscow is the capital.
1548		County of Stolberg is divided into Stolberg-Stolberg and Stolberg-Rochefort.
1549		The Kingdom of Portugal establishes a central government for its Colony of Brazil, with Salvador as the capital.
1549		The Saadi dynasty is established in Morocco. Taroudant is the capital.
1550		The Kingdom of Loango is established.
1552		The Ottoman Empire conquers Muscat from Portugal.
1552		The Tsardom of Russia annexes the Khanate of Kazan.
1554		Fall of the Wattasid dynasty in Morocco.
1555		The Republic of Siena is conquered by the Kingdom of Spain and most of it is granted to the Duchy of Florence. The Stato dei Presidi remain with Spain.
1555		The Safavids in Persia move their capital from Tabriz to Qazvin.
1556		The Sur Empire is annexed by the restored Mughal Empire.
1557		Portugal establishes a settlement in Macau.
1558	18 July	Russia conquers the Bishopric of Dorpat in Estonia.
1558		France reconquers Calais from England.
1558		The Nguyễn lords establish de facto control over central and southern Vietnam.
1559	November	The Bishopric of Ösel-Wiek in Western Estonia is sold to Denmark.
1559		The Mali Empire moves its capital from Niani to Kangaba.
1559		The Kingdom of Gorkha is founded. Gorkha is the capital.
1560	20 May	The Bishopric of Courland in Western Latvia is sold to Denmark.
1560		Lan Xang in Laos moves its capital from Luang Prabang to Vientiane.
1561	4 June	The northern Livonian Order regions of Harrien-Wierland (without Reval) and Jerwen pledge allegiance to Sweden.
1561	6 June	The northern Livonian Order town Reval pledges allegiance to Sweden.
1561	28 November	The Treaty of Vilnius dissolves the Livonian Order, which is in part organized as the Principality of Livonia in personal union with Lithuania, and in part organized as the Lithuanian vassal state Duchy of Courland and Semigallia, taking effect on 5 March 1562. The Archbishopric of Riga also becomes a vassal state of Lithuania and the former condominium town of Riga becomes a free imperial city.
1562		Turin replaces Chambéry as capital of the Duchy of Savoy.
1563		Sweden conquers from Denmark the former areas of the Bishopric of Ösel-Wiek in Wiek and Dagö, leaving Denmark only with its possessions in Ösel.
1564		The Bailiff of Soneburg of the former Livonian Order, now the Principality of Livonia, sells its bailiwick in the West Estonian archipelago to the Danish-controlled former Bishopric of Ösel-Wiek. In return, Denmark cedes its nominal rights over Swedish-controlled Wiek to the Lithuanian Principality of Livonia.
1565		The Kingdom of Spain establishes a colony in the Philippines with its administrative centre in Cebu.
1566	25 December	The Union of Grodno turns the personal union between the Principality of Livonia and Grand Duchy of Lithuania into a real union and the former is reorganized as the Duchy of Livonia. The Lithuanian vassal state Archbishopric of Riga is annexed to the Duchy of Livonia.
1569	1 July	The Kingdom of Poland and the Grand Duchy of Lithuania unite to form the Commonwealth of the Crown of the Polish Kingdom and Grand Duchy of Lithuania. Vilnius yields to Kraków as the capital.
1569	27 August	The Grand Duchy of Tuscany is established from the Duchy of Florence. Florence remains the capital.
1570	10 June	The Kingdom of Livonia is established as a vassal state of Russia in some of its conquered lands in Livonia.
1570	13 December	Denmark cedes its nominal rights over Dagö and the Polish-Lithuanian Commonwealth cedes its nominal rights over Harrien-Wierland (including Reval), Jerwen and Wiek to Sweden.
1571	18 March	The Order of Saint John moves the capital of Malta from Birgu to Valletta.
1571		The Mughal Empire moves its capital from Agra to Fatehpur Sikri.
1571		The Kingdom of Spain conquers the Luzon Empire.
1572	9 May	The Danish-controlled former Bishopric of Ösel-Wiek is annexed as Danish Ösel.
1573		The Kingdom of Portugal divides the Colony of Brazil into North Brazil (capital at Salvador) and South Brazil (capital at Rio de Janeiro).
1573		The Gujarat Sultanate is annexed by the Mughal Empire.
1573		In Japan, the Azuchi-Momoyama period follows the Sengoku period.
1573		The Ottoman Empire conquers the island of Cyprus from the Republic of Venice.
1575		The Kingdom of Portugal establishes colonies on the coast of Angola.
1575		The capital of Chile is moved from Concepción to Santiago.
1576		The Bengal Sultanate is annexed by the Mughal Empire.
1577		The Russian vassal state Kingdom of Livonia is disestablished.
1577		The Adal Sultanate is disestablished.
1578		The Kingdom of Portugal reunites North Brazil and South Brazil into the Colony of Brazil. The capital is Salvador.
1578		The Danish-controlled Bishopric of Courland becomes a vassal state of the Polish-Lithuanian Commonwealth.
1579		The Duchy of the Archipelago is annexed by the Ottoman Empire.
1580	July	Yermak Timofeyevich invades the territory of the Voguls, beginning the Russian conquest of Siberia.
1580	July	A personal union of the Monarchy of Spain and the Kingdom of Portugal results in the Iberian Union.
1581	14 January	The Treaty of Drohiczyn cedes the free imperial city of Riga to the Polish-Lithuanian Duchy of Livonia.
1581	26 July	The Republic of the Seven United Netherlands declares its independence from the Monarchy of Spain.
1582	15 January	The Truce of Yam-Zapolsky cedes the Russian-controlled areas in former central and southern Livonia to the Polish–Lithuanian Commonwealth.
1583	10 August	The Treaty of Plussa cedes all the remaining Russian-controlled areas in former Livonia to Sweden.
1584	20 March	Areas under Swedish control in Northern Estonia are annexed as the Duchy of Estonia.
1585		The Treaty of Kronborg formally cedes the nominally Danish but Polish-Lithuanian-controlled former Bishopric of Courland to the Polish-Lithuanian Commonwealth.
1585		The Kingdom of Luba is established in central Africa.
1586		The Mughal Empire moves its capital from Fatehpur Sikri to Lahore. In the same year the capital is moved again to Agra.
1586		Portugal establishes the colony of Portuguese Timor.
1590		Through its victory in the Ottoman-Safavid War, the Ottoman Empire expands eastwards.
1591		Fall of the Songhai Empire in West Africa.
1592		Japan invades the Korean Peninsula under Toyotomi Hideyoshi with the aim of attacking the Ming dynasty of China.
1594		Vimaladharmasuriya I moves the capital of the Sinhala Kingdom to Kandy, Sri Lanka.
1596		Willem Barentsz makes the first indisputable discovery of the Svalbard archipelago.
1597		The Duchy of Ferrara becomes part of the Papal States.
1598		Kuchum, Khan of Sibir, is killed in battle with Russian forces, thus completing the Russian conquest of Siberia.
1598		Japan withdraws from the Korean Peninsula after being pushed back by Chinese and Korean troops.
1598		The Safavids move their capital from Qazvin to Isfahan.

== 17th century ==
=== 1600s ===
Year	Date	Event
c. 1600		The Kingdom of Dahomey is established.
1600	31 December	The British East India Company is established.
1601	17 January	France gains Bresse, Bugey, and Gex from Savoy, and cedes Saluzzo to Savoy in exchange.
1602	20 March	The Dutch East India Company is established.
1603		Tokugawa Ieyasu establishes the Tokugawa shogunate in Japan, which follows the Azuchi-Momoyama period. Edo is the capital.
1607		The Virginia Colony is founded in North America.
1608	14 May	The Protestant Union is founded in the Holy Roman Empire.
1608	3 July	Quebec City is founded as the capital of New France.
1608		The Kingdom of Portugal divides the Colony of Brazil into North Brazil (capital at Salvador) and South Brazil (capital at Rio de Janeiro) for the second time.
1609	10 July	The Catholic League is founded in the Holy Roman Empire.
1609		The Ryukyu Kingdom becomes a vassal state of the Tokugawa shogunate.

=== 1610s ===
Year	Date	Event
1610		Henry Hudson discovers Hudson Bay.
1610		England establishes the Newfoundland Colony in North America.
1612		The Kingdom of Portugal reunites North Brazil and South Brazil into the Colony of Brazil. The capital is Salvador.
1614		The Kingdom of Portugal establishes the colony of Cacheu in what is now Guinea-Bissau.
1616	30 October	Taizu establishes the Later Jin dynasty in China.
1617	27 February	In the Treaty of Stolbovo, Sweden gains the Russian province and fortress of Kexholm (now Priozersk) and the province of Ingria including the fortress of Nöteborg (now Shlisselburg, Russia).
1617	9 May	The Polish-Lithuanian vassal state Bishopric of Courland comes into personal union with Poland-Lithuania.
1618	23 May	The Second Defenestration of Prague marks the beginning of the Thirty Years' War between the Catholic League and the Protestant Union in the Holy Roman Empire, which soon grips the whole of Europe.
1618	27 August	The personal union of the Electorate of Brandenburg with the Duchy of Prussia creates Brandenburg-Prussia. Berlin and Königsberg are the respective capitals.

=== 1620s ===
Year	Date	Event
1620	21 December	Plymouth Colony is founded by the Pilgrim Fathers.
1620		The Kasanje Kingdom is founded in central Africa.
1620		The Danish East India Company establishes the colony of Danish India.
1621	29 September	Nova Scotia is founded as a colony of the Kingdom of Scotland.
1621		The Kingdom of Portugal divides the Colony of Brazil into the State of Brazil and the State of Maranhão. The capitals are Salvador and São Luis, respectively.
1621		The Dutch West India Company is founded.
1623		The Electorate of Bavaria emerged from the Duchy of Bavaria. Munich remains the capital.
1624		The colony of New Netherland is established in North America.
1624		The colony of Dutch Formosa is established on Taiwan.
1626		The Dutch purchase the island of Manhattan and found New Amsterdam, which later becomes New York City.
1627	17 February	The Kingdom of England colonizes Barbados, with its capital at Saint James Town.
1629	26 September	The Truce of Altmark cedes most of the Duchy of Livonia in real union with the Polish-Lithuanian Commonwealth to Sweden as Swedish Livonia. The eastern part of the duchy is retained by Poland-Lithuania and is annexed as the Inflanty Voivodeship.
1629		The Massachusetts Bay Colony is founded in North America.
1629		The New Hampshire Colony is founded in North America.
1629		The Carolina Colony is founded in North America.

=== 1630s ===
Year	Date	Event
1630		The Dutch establish the colony of Dutch Brazil. The capital is Mauritsstad (now Recife).
1630		Sweden occupies the Duchy of Pomerania.
1631		The Kingdom of Matamba is established in southwest Africa.
1632		The Maryland Colony is founded. St. Mary's City is the capital.
1632		The Kingdom of England colonizes Antigua.
1635		Fasilides makes Gondar the first permanent capital of Ethiopia since the fall of the Zagwe Dynasty.
1635		The Saybrook Colony is founded in what is now the U.S. state of Connecticut. Old Saybrook is the capital.
1635		The Kingdom of France colonizes Guadeloupe, Martinique, and some islands of the Lesser Antilles.
1636	3 March	The Connecticut Colony is founded in North America. Hartford is the capital.
1636		The Colony of Rhode Island and Providence Plantations is founded in North America.
1636		Taizong establishes the Qing dynasty in China.
1637		Joseon becomes a tributary state of the Qing dynasty after the invasion of Korea.
1638		The colony of New Sweden is established in North America.
1638		The New Haven Colony is founded in what is now the U.S. state of Connecticut. New Haven is the capital.
1638		The Dutch East India Company takes possession of Mauritius.

=== 1640s ===
Year	Date	Event
1640	1 December	The Kingdom of Portugal separates from personal union with the Monarchy of Spain.
1640		The Emirate of Trarza is established in North Africa.
1641		The Kingdom of Portugal loses Malacca, Annobón, and Angola to the Republic of the Seven United Provinces.
1644	30 October	The Qing dynasty supersedes the Ming dynasty as the legitimate dynasty of China. Beijing is the capital.
1644		Hongguang establishes the Southern Ming dynasty in China.
1644		The Saybrook Colony is sold to the Connecticut Colony.
1645	13 August	The Kingdom of Denmark and Norway, the Wends and the Goths cedes Jämtland, Härjedalen, Idre & Särna, Gotland, Ösel, and Halland, the latter for a period of 30 years, to the Kingdom of Sweden as part of the Treaty of Brömsebro.
1646		The Vijayanagara Empire is dissolved.
1648		The Kingdom of England colonizes the Bahamas.
1648		The Thirty Years' War ends with the Peace of Westphalia.
1648		The Netherlands, Switzerland, and many Italian city-states are made independent of the Holy Roman Empire (Peace of Westphalia).
1648		The Duchy of Pomerania is divided between Sweden (Swedish Pomerania) and Brandenburg-Prussia (Farther Pomerania), although the precise borders would not be determined until 1653 (Peace of Westphalia).
1648		France receives the cities of the Décapole in Alsace (except Strasbourg, the Diocese of Strasbourg, and Mulhouse) and the city of Pignerol from the Spanish Duchy of Milan (Peace of Westphalia).
1648		The Mughal Empire moves its capital from Agra to Delhi.
1648		The Kingdom of Portugal takes back Angola from the Republic of the Seven United Provinces.
1649	19 May	The republican Commonwealth of England supersedes the Kingdom of England after the English Civil War.
1649		Grenada is acquired by the Kingdom of France.

=== 1650s ===
Year	Date	Event
1650		The Commonwealth of England colonizes Anguilla with settlers from Saint Kitts.
1652		The Dutch East India Company establishes the Dutch Cape Colony.
1653	4 May	The precise borders between Swedish Pomerania and Farther Pomerania (Brandenburg-Prussia) are determined by the Treaty of Stettin.
1654		During the Dutch-Portuguese War, the Kingdom of Portugal conquers the colony of Dutch Brazil from the Republic of the Seven United Provinces.
1655		The colony of New Sweden falls to the Dutch.
1656		The former Bishopric of Courland, until then in personal union with the Polish-Lithuanian Commonwealth, is sold to the Polish-Lithuanian vassal state Duchy of Courland and Semigallia and becomes its vassal state instead.
1657		The Treaty of Bromberg gives the Duchy of Prussia its sovereignty.
1658	26 February	Denmark-Norway cedes Skåne, Blekinge, Halland, Bornholm, Båhus, and Trøndelag to the Kingdom of Sweden as part of the Treaty of Roskilde.
1658	16 December	The Commonwealth of England, Scotland and Ireland supersedes the Commonwealth of England, the Kingdom of Scotland, and the Kingdom of Ireland. Edinburgh and Dublin yield to London as the capital.
1658		During the Dutch-Portuguese War, the Dutch gain control of Portuguese-held possessions in Sri Lanka from the Kingdom of Portugal.
1659		The Kingdom of France establishes the colony of Saint-Louis as the first French settlement in Africa.
1659		Treaty of the Pyrenees: Artois, Roussillon, and Perpignan are annexed by Kingdom of France.
1659	5 May	The British East India Company takes possession of Saint Helena.
1659		Fall of the Saadi dynasty in Morocco.

=== 1660s ===
Year	Date	Event
1660	4 April	The restored Kingdom of England, Kingdom of Scotland, and Kingdom of Ireland supersede the republican Commonwealth of England, Scotland and Ireland. London, Edinburgh, and Dublin are the respective capitals.
1660	3 May	The Treaty of Oliva cedes Runö Island in Estonia from the Polish-Lithuanian vassal state Duchy of Courland and Semigallia to Sweden.
1660	27 May	The Kingdom of Sweden cedes Trøndelag and Bornholm to Denmark-Norway as part of the Treaty of Copenhagen.
1661	25 February	The former Bishopric of Courland, a vassal state of the Duchy of Courland and Semigallia (itself a vassal state of the Polish-Lithuanian Commonwealth), comes into personal union with Courland and Semigallia.
1661	14 June	The Kingdom of Tungning is proclaimed in Taiwan.
1661		Portuguese India cedes the port of Bombay to the British as dowry to King Charles II of England
1661		The Kingdom of Portugal hands Tangier over to the Kingdom of England as a dowry.
1662		The Southern Ming dynasty ends with the conquest by the Qing dynasty.
1662		Dutch Formosa is conquered by the Southern Ming dynasty.
1663		The Duchy of Massa and Carrara is established. Massa is the capital.
1664		The Dutch Republic signs the Treaty of Breda, which cedes New Netherland to the Kingdom of England.
1664		The Delaware Colony is founded in North America. New Castle is the capital.
1664		The New Jersey Colony is founded in North America.
1664		The New York Colony is founded in North America. New York City is the capital.
1664		The New Haven Colony is merged into the Connecticut Colony.
1664		The French East India Company is founded.
1664		The Alawi dynasty is established in Morocco.
1665		The Kingdom of Lunda is established in central Africa.
1665		The Kingdom of England establishes the Colony of Jamaica. Spanish Town is the capital.
1666		The Khanate of Kalat is established.
1666		The Kingdom of France conquers Anguilla from the Kingdom of England.
1667	9 February	The Truce of Andrusovo. Left-Bank Ukraine, Kyiv, and Smolensk is given to the Russian Tsardom. Poland-Lithuania was left with Right-Bank Ukraine, and Russian-occupied Belarus with Vitebsk, Polotsk, and Dzwinsk. Zaporizhzhia was recognized as a condominium of both states.
1667	31 July	The Kingdom of France returns Anguilla to the Kingdom of England according to the Treaty of Breda.
1668	2 May	Kingdom of France acquires Armentières, Bergues, Charleroi, Kortrijk, Douai, Veurne, Lille, Oudenaarde and Tournai (Treaty of Aix-la-Chapelle).

=== 1670s ===
Year	Date	Event
1673		The Kingdom of France acquires Puducherry.
1674		Shivaji establishes the Maratha Empire in Maharashtra.
1676		Ottoman Empire gains parts of Podolia and parts of Central Ukraine from Poland-Lithuania
1677		The Mạc dynasty of Vietnam collapses.
1678	August	The Treaty of Nijmegen is signed. Spain gives Franche-Comté, Ypres, Maubeuge, Câteau-Cambrésis, Valenciennes, Saint-Omer and Cassel to France and France restores Charleroi and Philippsburg

=== 1680s ===
Year	Date	Event
1680		The Kingdom of Burundi is established.
1681		The Pennsylvania Colony is founded in North America. Philadelphia is the capital.
1682		French explorer Robert de La Salle sails down the Mississippi River and claims all the lands along the river for France under the name Louisiana.
1683	12 September	The Second Siege of Vienna by the Ottoman Empire fails.
1683		The Tungning Kingdom is conquered by the Qing dynasty. The island of Taiwan falls back under the control of the Qing.
1684		The English Crown Colony of Bermuda supersedes the Somers Isles Company. Hamilton is the capital.
1684		The Kingdom of England hands Tangier over to the Alawi dynasty.
1685		The Kingdom of England colonizes Barbuda.
1686		Russian Tsardom gains Kiev and Zaporizhzhia from Poland-Lithuania from Treaty of Eternal Peace
1689		Wales ceases to have an official or administrative capital when Ludlow ceases to be the administrative capital following the end of the Council of Wales and the Marches.
1689		Treaty of Nerchinsk is signed between Tsardom of Russia and Qing Dynasty. Russia gives up the area north of the Amur River as far as the Stanovoy Range and kept the area between the Argun River and Lake Baikal.

=== 1690s ===
Year	Date	Event
1692		The Massachusetts Bay Colony and Plymouth Colony are reorganized as the Province of Massachusetts Bay.
1692		The Electorate of Hanover is established. Hanover is the capital.
1695		The capital of Maryland Colony is moved from St. Mary's City to Annapolis.
1697		The western half of the colony of Santo Domingo (Kingdom of Spain) on the island of Hispaniola is recognised as the colony of Saint-Domingue of the Kingdom of France (Peace of Ryswijk).
1697		The Kingdom of France hands over territories to the Holy Roman Empire (Peace of Ryswijk).
1697		The Kingdom of France recognizes the Kingdom of England (Peace of Ryswijk).
1697		A personal union is established between the Electorate of Saxony and Poland-Lithuania.
1699	26 January	The Ottoman Empire cedes the Eğri Eyalet, the Varat Eyalet, northern parts of the Temeşvar Eyalet, most of the Budin Eyalet, and parts of the Bosnia Eyalet to the Habsburg monarchy. This territory plus the Principality of Transylvania corresponds to most of the territory of mediaeval Hungary previously lost to the Ottomans (Ottoman Hungary). (Treaty of Karlowitz)
1699	26 January	The Principality of Transylvania, while nominally independent, becomes de facto under Habsburg rule. (Treaty of Karlowitz)
1699	26 January	The Ottoman Empire returns Podolia to Poland-Lithuania. (Treaty of Karlowitz)
1699	26 January	The Ottoman Empire cedes Morea and most of Dalmatia to the Republic of Venice. (Treaty of Karlowitz)

== 18th century ==
=== 1700s ===
Year	Date	Event
1700	1 November	With the beginning of Philip V's reign over the Kingdom of Spain, Spain and its territories cease to be part of the Habsburg monarchy.
1700		The Ottoman Empire cedes Azov to the Tsardom of Russia by the Treaty of Constantinople.
1701	18 January	Brandenburg-Prussia becomes the Kingdom of Prussia. Berlin is the capital.
1701		The Duchy of Mecklenburg is divided into Mecklenburg-Schwerin and Mecklenburg-Strelitz.
1701		The Ashanti Empire is established in West Africa. Kumasi is the capital.
1704	October	The Kingdom of France and Spanish Empire take control of Nassau from the English, but soon abandon the city, returning control to the English.
1704		The Mamluk dynasty in Iraq is established. Baghdad is the capital.
1705		The Electorate of Hanover receives the Principality of Lüneburg and the Duchy of Saxe-Lauenburg.
1706		End of the personal union between the Electorate of Saxony and Poland-Lithuania.
1707	25 April	The Crown of Castile integrates the Kingdom of Valencia part of the Crown of Aragon through invasion (Battle of Almansa).
1707	1 May	The Acts of Union 1707 unite the Kingdom of England and the Kingdom of Scotland to form the Kingdom of Great Britain. Edinburgh yields to London as the capital for all but judicial functions.
1707	29 June	The Nueva Planta decrees abolish the Crown of Castile and make it part of the centralized Kingdom of Spain.
1707		Lan Xang in Laos disintegrates into three parts: the Kingdom of Luang Phrabang in the north, the Kingdom of Vientiane in the middle, and the Kingdom of Champasak in the south.
1709	21 April	Mirwais Hotak establishes the Hotak dynasty. Isfahan and Kandahar are the capitals.
1709		Second personal union between the Electorate of Saxony and Poland-Lithuania.
1709		The Khanate of Kokand is established in Central Asia as a spin-off of the Khanate of Bukhara. Kokand is the capital.

=== 1710s ===
Year	Date	Event
1710		The Kong Empire is established in West Africa.
1711	21 July	The Tsardom of Russia returns Azov to the Ottoman Empire by the Treaty of the Pruth.
1711		The Principality of Transylvania is integrated de jure into the Habsburg monarchy as a crown land.
1711		Cap-François becomes the capital of the French colony of Saint-Domingue.
1711		The Duchy of Mirandola becomes part of the Duchy of Modena and Reggio.
1712		The Carolina Colony is split into the North Carolina Colony and the South Carolina Colony.
1712		The Tsardom of Russia moves its capital from Moscow to Saint Petersburg.
1713	March–April	The Treaty of Utrecht is signed. The Kingdom of Great Britain takes sovereignty over Gibraltar and Menorca from the Kingdom of Spain. Spain also cedes Sicily and parts of the Duchy of Milan to Savoy; the Spanish Netherlands, the Kingdom of Naples, Sardinia, and the bulk of the Duchy of Milan to Charles VI, Holy Roman Emperor; and lands in South America between the Amazon River and the Oiapoque River to the Kingdom of Portugal.
1713	July	The Kingdom of France conquers Kaiserslautern, Landau, and Breisgau.
1714	7 March	The Austrian Netherlands follow the Spanish Netherlands. Brussels is the capital.
1714	7 March	The Duchy of Milan, the Kingdom of Sardinia, the Kingdom of Naples, and the Spanish Netherlands are ceded by the Kingdom of Spain to the Habsburg monarchy.
1714	7 March	The Habsburg monarchy receives Freiburg im Breisgau and several other small territories on its eastern borders from France, but France keeps Landau.
1714	11 September	Fall of the Crown of Aragon, invaded by the Crown of Castile, marked by the Siege of Barcelona and the annexation of the Principality of Catalonia. A unified Kingdom of Spain is created through the Nueva Planta decrees.
1714		The Electorate of Hanover enters into a personal union with the Kingdom of Great Britain.
1715	28 November	Spain integrates the Kingdom of Majorca, the last part of the Crown of Aragon, through invasion.
1715		The Kingdom of Spain returns Colonia del Sacramento to the Kingdom of Portugal.
1715		The Kingdom of France annexes Mauritius after the Dutch abandon it.
1715		The Nueva Planta decrees abolish the Crown of Castile and make it part of the centralized Kingdom of Spain.
1717	27 May	The Viceroyalty of New Granada is established from parts of the Viceroyalty of Peru as an overseas territory of the Kingdom of Spain.
1717		The former Bishopric of Courland, until then in personal union with the Duchy of Courland and Semigallia (itself a vassal state of the Polish-Lithuanian Commonwealth), comes into personal union directly with Poland-Lithuania.
1718	21 July	The Ottoman Empire cedes to the Habsburg monarchy the territories of Banat, southeastern Syrmia, central Serbia, part of northern Bosnia, and part of Wallachia (an Ottoman vassal) known as Oltenia (Treaty of Passarowitz).
1718	21 July	The Kingdom of Serbia is established as a Habsburg crown land (Treaty of Passarowitz).
1718	21 July	The Banat of Temeswar is established as a Habsburg crown land (Treaty of Passarowitz).
1718	21 July	Venice returns Morea (gained by the Treaty of Karlowitz) and its Cretan holdings to the Ottomans.
1718	21 July	The Ottoman Empire cede parts of Dalmatia (Imotski, Sinj, and Vrgorac).
1719	9 November	Sweden cedes Bremen-Verden to the Electorate of Hanover.

=== 1720s ===
Year	Date	Event
1720	21 January	Sweden cedes the portion of Swedish Pomerania south of the Peene and east of the Peenestrom to Prussia.
1720		The Duchy of Savoy receives the Kingdom of Sardinia from the Habsburg monarchy in exchange for Sicily.
1720		The Electorate of the Palatinate moves its capital from Düsseldorf to Mannheim.
1721	30 August	Swedish Estonia, Ingria, Livonia, and most of Karelia is ceded by Sweden to the Tsardom of Russia according to the terms of the Treaty of Nystad.
1721	22 October	Peter the Great proclaims the Russian Empire from the Tsardom of Russia.
1723		The Viceroyalty of New Granada again becomes part of the Viceroyalty of Peru.
1728		On Greenland (then part of Denmark-Norway), Hans Egede founds the colony of Godthåb.

=== 1730s ===
Year	Date	Event
1732		The Georgia Colony is founded in British North America. Savannah is the capital.
1736		The Afsharid dynasty is established in Persia and follows the Safavid dynasty. Mashhad is the capital.
1737		The Kingdom of Portugal moves the capital of its colonial State of Maranhão from São Luís to Belém.
1738		The Hotak dynasty is disestablished.
1738		Habsburg Monarchy loses the crowns of Naples and Sicily to Charles of Parma, the Duchy of Lorraine to Stanislaus Leszczyński, the Duchy of Parma to Austria, the Grand Duchy of Tuscany to Francis Stephen, the Polish-Lithuanian Commonwealth loses direct control over the Duchy of Courland and Semigallia.
1739	1 January	Jean-Baptiste Charles Bouvet de Lozier discovers Bouvet Island in the South Atlantic Ocean.
1739	18 September	The Habsburg monarchy cedes the Kingdom of Serbia, the southern part of the Banat of Temeswar, and northern Bosnia to the Ottoman Empire (Treaty of Belgrade).
1739	18 September	The Habsburg monarchy returns Oltenia to Wallachia (Treaty of Belgrade).
1739		The Viceroyalty of New Granada is again separated from the Viceroyalty of Peru.

=== 1740s ===
Year	Date	Event
1740		The Oyo Empire is established in West Africa.
1742		Treaty of Berlin:Silesia is Partitioned between Prussia and the House of Habsburg;Prussia receives the majority of silesia while Austria retains a smaller area hence known as Austrian Silesia
1744		The Kingdom of Matamba is annexed to Portuguese Angola.
1745		The kingdoms of Croatia and Slavonia are unified into the Kingdom of Croatia-Slavonia within the Habsburg monarchy. Zagreb is the capital.
1745		The Kingdom of Swaziland is established in southern Africa.
1747	October	The Durrani Empire is founded near Kandahar on a Loya jirga, when Ahmad Shah Abdali is chosen as the king of the newly independent empire. He is later regarded as the founder of modern Afghanistan.
1747		The Safavid Empire collapses.
1748	18 October	Duchies of Parma, Piacenza, and Gustalla ceded to the Spanish Bourbons (Treaty of Aix-la-Chapelle).

=== 1750s ===
Year	Date	Event
1750	13 January	The Kingdom of Spain and the Kingdom of Portugal sign the Treaty of Madrid. Based on the uti possidetis concept, Portugal gains lands on the actual south, central, and north regions of Brazil. The treaty also stipulates that Spain receive the Colonia del Sacramento and Portugal the Misiones Orientales.
1751	21 September	Through the Treaty of Strömstad, the border between Sweden and Norway is finally settled, from the beginning of the land border in Iddefjord until Norway's border on Russia at Varanger (since Finland was part of Sweden at this time, the border between the two countries continued beyond the present end point of the border between Norway and Sweden).
1751		The Kingdom of Portugal changes the name of its colonial State of Maranhão to State of Great-Pará and Maranhão.
1751		Karim Khan establishes the Zand dynasty in Persia. Shiraz is the capital.
1752		Establishment of the Konbaung dynasty in Burma. Shwebo is the capital.
1752		The Sheikdom of Kuwait is established. Kuwait City is the capital.
1753		During the Seven Years' War, France occupies the island of Menorca.
1757		The British East India Company gains control of Bengal from the Mughal Empire, initiating the British Raj in India.
1758		The Dzungar Khanate is annexed by the Qing dynasty of China.
1758		The Kingdom of Great Britain conquers Senegambia from the Kingdom of France.
1758		The Sultanate of Sulu becomes independent from the Bruneian Empire.

=== 1760s ===
Year	Date	Event
1761	12 February	The Kingdom of Spain and the Kingdom of Portugal sign the Treaty of El Pardo, nullifying the Treaty of Madrid.
1762	13 November	Following the end of the French and Indian War in North America, the Louisiana Territory is transferred from France to Spain in the secret Treaty of Fontainebleau.
1762		The Kingdom of Kartli and the Kingdom of Kakheti unite to form the Kingdom of Kartli-Kakheti. Tbilisi is the capital.
1763	10 February	The Seven Years' War ends with the Treaty of Paris, which formalizes a number of territorial transfers between Great Britain, France, and Spain; among these is the transfer of the northernmost parts of New France (present-day Canada) to the British.
1763	12 February	The Kingdom of Portugal moves the capital of its colony of the State of Brazil from Salvador to Rio de Janeiro.
1763		End of the second personal union between the Electorate of Saxony and Poland-Lithuania.
1765		The Grand Duchy of Transylvania follows the Principality of Transylvania.
1766		France annexes the Duchy of Lorraine.
	4 October	The Falkland Islands start depending from the Governorate of Buenos Aires instead of Kingdom of Chile.
1767		Ayutthaya, capital of the Ayutthaya Kingdom, is destroyed during the Burmese–Siamese War. The Thonburi Kingdom follows the Ayutthaya Kingdom in Siam.
1768	15 May	Genoa sells to France its rights to Corsica.
1768	21 December	Prithvi Narayan Shah unifies the Kingdom of Nepal. Kathmandu is the capital.

=== 1770s ===
Year	Date	Event
1770	28 April	James Cook reaches Australia and takes possession of the land for the Kingdom of Great Britain.
1770		The capital of the French colony of Saint-Domingue is moved from Cap-François to Port-au-Prince.
1772	5 August	The Kingdom of Galicia and Lodomeria is founded as the crown land of the Habsburg monarchy. Lemberg is the capital.
1772	5 August	First partition of Poland.
1772		The Kingdom of Portugal divides its colony of the State of Great-Pará and Maranhão into the State of Great-Pará (capital at Belém) and the State of Maranhão (capital at São Luis).
1772		Following Ayutthaya's destruction in 1767, the new capital of Siam is created in Thonburi.
1774		The County of Oldenburg is made the Duchy of Oldenburg.
1775		The Kingdom of Portugal reunites its South American colonies of the State of Brazil, the State of Great-Pará, and the State of Maranhão into the Colony of Brazil. Rio de Janeiro is the capital.
1775		The Habsburg monarchy annexes the northwestern part of Moldavia (later known as Bukovina).
1776	4 March	The American colonies occupy Nassau from the British during the American Revolutionary War.
1776	17 March	The American colonies abandon Nassau, returning control to the British during the American Revolutionary War.
1776	4 May	The Colony of Rhode Island and Providence Plantations declares its independence from the Kingdom of Great Britain. Providence is the capital.
1776	4 July	Thirteen British colonies in North America, including the State of Rhode Island and Providence Plantations, collectively declare their independence from the Kingdom of Great Britain, as the United States of America. Philadelphia is the first of eight cities that will serve as a temporary capital until 1800.
1776	20 December	The United States of America moves its temporary capital from Philadelphia to Baltimore.
1776		The Viceroyalty of the Río de la Plata is separated from the Viceroyalty of Peru. The Kingdom of Chile losses the cities of Mendoza and San Juan (Cuyo Province). Buenos Aires is the capital.
1776		The Durrani Empire moves its capital from Kandahar to Kabul. The winter capital is Peshawar.
1777	15 January	The Republic of New Connecticut declares its independence from the Kingdom of Great Britain. Westminster is the temporary capital.
1777	4 March	The United States of America moves its temporary capital back from Baltimore to Philadelphia.
1777	4 June	The Republic of New Connecticut moves its capital from Westminster to Windsor.
1777	8 July	The Republic of New Connecticut changes its name to the Vermont Republic.
1777	27 September	The United States of America moves its temporary capital from Philadelphia to Lancaster for one day, following the capture of Philadelphia by British forces.
1777	30 September	The United States of America moves its temporary capital from Lancaster to York.
1777	1 October	The Kingdom of Spain and the Kingdom of Portugal sign the First Treaty of San Ildefonso, confirming almost all the borders defined by the Treaty of Madrid, with the exception that Spain will rule both Colonia del Sacramento and the Misiones Orientales.
1778	11 June	The Vermont Republic claims the "East Union", consisting of some towns in New Hampshire which had petitioned earlier in the year to join with Vermont. Vermont never gains full control over the area.
1778	27 July	The United States of America moves its temporary capital from York back to Philadelphia.
1778	21 October	The Vermont Republic rescinds its claim to the "East Union", consisting of some towns in New Hampshire.
1778		Thái Đức establishes the Tây Sơn dynasty in Vietnam.
1778		The Kingdom of Portugal cedes Annobón and Bioko to the Kingdom of Spain.
1778		The Kingdom of Champasak becomes a vassal state of Siam.

=== 1780s ===
Year	Date	Event
1781	4 April	The Vermont Republic once again claims the "East Union", consisting of some towns in New Hampshire that wish to join with Vermont, though the exact extent of the borders is unknown. Vermont never gains full control over the area.
1781	June–July	The Vermont Republic claims the "West Union", consisting of some towns in New York. The specific date this occurs is unclear; sources suggest 16 June, 26 June, and 18 July.
1782	22 February	The Vermont Republic abandons its claims of the East Union from New Hampshire and the West Union from New York.
1782	21 April	Siam moves its capital from Thonburi to Bangkok.
1782	6 May	The Spanish Empire captures The Bahamas from the Kingdom of Great Britain.
1783	20 January	Great Britain surrenders East Florida and West Florida to Spain.
1783	18 April	The Kingdom of Great Britain recaptures The Bahamas from the Spanish Empire.
1783	19 April	The Crimean Khanate is annexed by the Russian Empire and incorporated as the Taurida Governorate.
1783	3 September	The Kingdom of Great Britain signs the Treaty of Paris, formally recognizing the independence of the United States of America.
1783	3 September	Rule over Senegambia is redistributed between the Kingdom of Great Britain and the Kingdom of France. The French get most of Senegambia (present-day Senegal) and the British get the Gambia Valley (present-day Gambia).
1783	26 November	The United States of America moves its temporary capital from Philadelphia to Princeton, and then to Annapolis.
1783		The Province of Trinidad moves its capital from San José de Oruña to Puerto de España.
1784	1 July	King Gustav III of Sweden acquires the island of Saint Barthélemy in the Caribbean from France. It becomes a Swedish colony for nearly a century.
1784	1 November	The United States of America moves its temporary capital from Annapolis to Trenton.
1784		King Joseph II moves the capital of the Hungarian Kingdom back to Buda.
1784		Russian seafarer and merchant Grigory Ivanovich Shelikhov arrives in Three Saints Bay in Alaska.
1784		The Khanate of Kalat hands over Gwadar to Oman.
1785	11 January	The United States of America moves its temporary capital from Trenton to New York City.
1785		The Emirate of Bukhara follows the Khanate of Bukhara.
1787		Andrianampoinimerina establishes the Kingdom of Madagascar. Antananarivo is the capital.
1788	26 January	The British colony of New South Wales is established in Australia.
1789		The Later Lê dynasty of Vietnam collapses.
1789		The Principality of Lippe is formed from the County of Lippe.

=== 1790s ===
Year	Date	Event
1790	11 January	The United States of Belgium declares its independence from the House of Habsburg. Brussels is the capital.
1790	6 December	The United States of America moves its temporary capital from New York City to Philadelphia pending the construction of the new capital permitted by the new United States Constitution.
1790	7 December	The United States of Belgium capitulates to the House of Habsburg.
1791	4 March	The Vermont Republic joins the United States of America as the State of Vermont. Windsor yields to Philadelphia as the federal capital.
1792	28 January	The Principality of Ansbach and the Principality of Bayreuth become part of the Kingdom of Prussia.
1792	21 September	The first French Republic supersedes the Kingdom of France.
1792	17 December	Most of the Prince-Bishopric of Basel becomes the Rauracian Republic, retaining only Schliengen.
1792		The Dutch West India Company is dissolved.
1793	23 January	Second partition of Poland.
1793	2 March	France annexes the Principality of Salm-Salm.
1793	23 March	The Rauracian Republic is annexed by France to form the département of Mont-Terrible.
1793	25 June	Avignon is transferred from the Papal States to the French First Republic.
1794	May	The Trans-Oconee Republic is established by Elijah Clarke, in an attempt to head off the new Federal government's ceding of lands claimed by Georgia back to the Creek.
1794	September	1,200 Georgia militiamen as well as U.S. federal troops surround and isolate fortifications in the Trans-Oconee Republic and the nation's founder Elijah Clarke and his followers surrender and leave the settlements, destroying the republic as a result.
1794		Aga Mohammed Khan establishes the Qajar dynasty in Persia after the collapse of the Zand dynasty. Tehran is the capital.
1794		The Republic of Senarica is annexed by the Kingdom of Naples.
1795	19 January	The Batavian Republic supersedes the Republic of the Seven United Netherlands. Amsterdam is the capital.
1795	17 June	A revolt occurs in Swellendam in the Dutch Cape Colony due to dissatisfaction with the Dutch East India Company and the Republic of Swellendam is declared.
1795	24 October	The Polish-Lithuanian Commonwealth is partitioned. Its vassal state Duchy of Courland and Semigallia and the former Bishopric of Courland, until then in personal union with Poland-Lithuania, are annexed to the Russian Empire together as its Courland Governorate.
1795	4 November	British occupation in the Cape brings an end to the Republic of Swellendam.
1795		France annexes Southern Netherlands and the Duchy of Bouillon.
1795		The Dutch lose its territories held in Malacca and Sri Lanka to the British.
1796	25 April	Spain cedes the northern half of West Florida to the United States of America.
1796	10 May	The Napoleonic Cispadane Republic is created in northern Italy from the Duchy of Modena and Reggio, the Duchy of Massa and Carrara and the Papal States. Modena is the capital.
1797	17 April	The Habsburg monarchy annexes the Republic of Venice.
1797	14 July	The Republic of Genoa becomes the Napoleonic Ligurian Republic. Genoa is the capital.
1797	18 October	The Austrian Netherlands and various Mediterranean islands, including Corfu, are ceded to France. (Treaty of Campo Formio)
1797	18 October	The Republic of Venice is dissolved. Venetia (the eastern portion of Domini di Terraferma, roughly modern Veneto and Friuli-Venezia Giulia), Istria, and Dalmatia are annexed by Austria. (Treaty of Campo Formio)
1797	18 October	Austria recognizes the Cisalpine Republic and Ligurian Republic. (Treaty of Campo Formio)
1797	18 October	The Kingdom of Italy is recognized as defunct and all subordinate territories are formally released from the Holy Roman Empire. (Treaty of Campo Formio)
1797		The Cispadane Republic becomes the Cisalpine Republic. Milan is the capital.
1798	4 January	France annexes Mulhouse.
1798	15 March	The Kingdom of Chile is separated from the Viceroyalty of Peru. Santiago is the capital.
1798	12 April	The Napoleonic Helvetic Republic is declared. Aarau is the capital.
1798	11 June	The Order of Saint John capitulates to French forces and Malta is under French occupation with Valletta remaining the capital.
1798	21 July	France conquers Egypt from the Ottoman Empire.
1798	28 October	The Gozitan Nation gains de facto independence from Malta with Rabat as its capital.
1799	7 July	Establishment of the Sikh Empire after capture of Lahore by Maharaja Ranjit Singh and unification of the Sikh Confederacy under him.
1799	31 October	The State of Muskogee is proclaimed by William Augustus Bowles, a Loyalist veteran of the American Revolutionary War who lived among the Muscogee, in what is now the U.S. state of Florida. Its capital was Mikasuke.
1799		The Principality of Lippe follows the County of Lippe.
1799		The Dutch East India Company is dissolved.

== 19th century ==
=== 1800s ===
Year	Date	Event
1800	5 September	French forces in Malta surrender to the British. The island becomes the British protectorate of Malta with Valletta as capital.
1800	1 October	After a secretly negotiated treaty between France and Spain, Spain returns the North American colony of Louisiana to France.
1800	17 November	The United States of America moves its capital from Philadelphia to its permanent location at Washington in the District of Columbia.
1800	1 February	The Dutch East Indies are established by the Batavian Republic after the dissolution of the Dutch East India Company. Batavia is the capital.
1800	17 February	The French département of Mont-Terrible is merged into the département of Haut-Rhin.
1801	1 January	The Kingdom of Great Britain and the Kingdom of Ireland unite to form the United Kingdom of Great Britain and Ireland. Dublin yields to London as the capital.
1801	6 June	The Kingdom of Spain and the Kingdom of Portugal sign the Treaty of Badajoz, by which Spain cedes the South American Misiones Orientales to Portugal, and Portugal cedes Olivenza to Spain.
1801	20 August	The Gozitan Nation is annexed by the British protectorate of Malta.
1801	12 September	The Kingdom of Kartli-Kakheti is annexed by the Russian Empire.
1801		Egypt again falls under the control of the Ottoman Empire.
1802	26 January	The Cisalpine Republic is renamed the Italian Republic.
1802	25 March	The United Kingdom establishes the Crown Colony of British Ceylon in Sri Lanka.
1802		Napoleon separates the Canton of Valais from the Helvetic Republic to form the Rhodanic Republic.
1802		Gia Long establishes the Nguyễn dynasty in Vietnam. Huế is the capital.
1802		Trinidad becomes a British colony.
1803	19 February	The Act of Mediation converts the Helvetic Republic into the Swiss Confederation.
1803	27 April	The Reichsdeputationshauptschluss results in the following geopolitical changes: All but three ecclesiastical states of the Holy Roman Empire are either secularized or annexed by other states (the exceptions are the Archbishopric of Regensburg and the lands of the Teutonic Knights and Knights of Saint John).; The Duchy of Salzburg (formerly the Archbishopric of Salzburg) is raised to an electorate.; The Electorate of Baden emerges from the Margraviate of Baden. Karlsruhe is the capital.; The Electorate of Baden receives the Electorate of Palatinate.; The Electorate of Hesse emerges from the Landgravate of Hesse-Kassel. Kassel is the capital.; The Principality of Regensburg is established. Regensburg is the capital.
1803		The Ottoman Empire reconquers Iraq from the Mamluk dynasty.
1803		The State of Muskogee is destroyed after its Director General, William Augustus Bowles, is captured by the Spanish.
1804	1 January	The French colony of Saint-Domingue on Hispaniola declares its independence from the French Republic as Haiti. Port-au-Prince remains the capital.
1804	4 March	The French Republic sells La Louisiane to the United States of America in the Louisiana Purchase. New Orleans (Nouvelle-Orléans) is the capital of the unorganized territory.
1804	18 May	The first French Empire supersedes the first French Republic.
1804	11 August	Francis II, Holy Roman Emperor, establishes the Austrian Empire. Vienna is the capital.
1804	22 September	Jean-Jacques Dessalines establishes the Empire of Haiti.
1804		The Kingdom of Galicia and Lodomeria becomes part of the Austrian Empire.
1804		The Sokoto Caliphate is established.
1805	July	France annexes the Principality of Piombino and the Republic of Lucca and reconstitutes them as the Principality of Lucca and Piombino.
1805	4 July	France annexes the Ligurian Republic.
1805	26 December	The Electorate of Bavaria is raised to the Kingdom of Bavaria. Munich is the capital.
1806	8 January	The United Kingdom establishes the Cape Colony. Cape Town is the capital.
1806	5 June	The Kingdom of Holland (Netherlands) supersedes the Batavian Republic.
1806	25 July	Napoleon I of France establishes the Confederation of the Rhine. Frankfurt is the capital.
1806	6 August	Francis II, Holy Roman Emperor, dissolves the Holy Roman Empire of the German Nation.
1806	13 August	The Grand Duchy of Hesse follows the Landgraviate of Hesse-Darmstadt. Darmstadt is the capital.
1806	30 August	The Duchy of Nassau is established as a state of the Confederation of the Rhine. Weilburg and Wiesbaden are the capitals.
1806	17 October	The Empire of Haiti collapses upon the assassination of Emperor Jacques I. Haiti splits in two, with the State of Haiti in the north and the Republic of Haiti in the south. The capitals are Milot and Port-au-Prince, respectively.
1806	24 October	The Grand Duchy of Baden follows the Electorate of Baden. Karlsruhe is the capital.
1806	20 December	The Electorate of Saxony is raised to the Kingdom of Saxony. Dresden is the capital.
1807	July	Napoleon Bonaparte creates the Duchy of Warsaw from land ceded by the Kingdom of Prussia by the Treaties of Tilsit.
1807	9 September	The Free City of Danzig is established as a client state of France.
1807	7 December	The Kingdom of Westphalia is established as a client state of France.
1807	10 December	France annexes the Kingdom of Etruria.
1808	1 January	Sierra Leone is established as a crown colony of the United Kingdom. Freetown is the capital.
1808	31 January	The Kingdom of Italy annexes the Republic of Ragusa.
1808	7 March	The Kingdom of Portugal and the Algarves removes the capital from Lisbon to exile in Rio de Janeiro, Brazil.
1808		Spain becomes a client state of the First French Empire after the country is partially occupied by French forces and Joseph I is set as king by Napoleon.
1809	29 March	The Russian Tsar is declared Grand-duke of Finland, effectively separating Finland from Sweden and turning it into a Russian autonomous duchy.
1809	17 September	Sweden officially cedes Finland to Russia through the Peace of Hamina.
1809	14 October	The Treaty of Schönbrunn results in the following geopolitical changes: Salzburg is ceded to the Kingdom of Bavaria.; West Galicia is ceded to the Duchy of Warsaw.; Tarnopol is ceded to the Russian Empire.; Trieste and Croatia south of the Sava are ceded to France; these become the Illyrian provinces.
1809		Napoleon Bonaparte dissolves the Teutonic Knights; their lands are redistributed between neighboring states of the Holy Roman Empire, mostly to Württemberg.
1809		The United Kingdom occupies the Ionian Islands.

=== 1810s ===
Year	Date	Event
1810	20 February	The Russian Empire annexes the Kingdom of Imereti.
1810	April	Kamehameha I unifies the Kingdom of Hawaiʻi.
1810	19 April	The First Republic of Venezuela is established, starting the Venezuelan War of Independence from Spain.
1810	22 May	By the terms of the Treaty of Paris, the Principality of Regensburg is formally incorporated into the Kingdom of Bavaria.
1810	25 May	During the May Revolution, the Spanish viceroy in the Viceroyalty of the Río de la Plata (Argentina, Bolivia, Paraguay, and Uruguay) is replaced by the Primera Junta, and the United Provinces of the Río de la Plata is established. Buenos Aires remains the capital.
1810	13 July	The Kingdom of Holland (Netherlands) is annexed by the First French Empire.
1810	20 July	Colombia declares its independence from the Monarchy of Spain.
1810	16 September	Mexico declares its independence from the Monarchy of Spain.
1810	18 September	Chile installs an autonomous government recognizing the Monarchy of Spain because of the absence of King Ferdinand VII. Santiago is the capital.
1810	26 September	The Republic of West Florida declares independence from the Monarchy of Spain.
1810	10 December	The United States of America takes control of the Republic of West Florida.
1810	13 December	France annexes northern Germany (Hamburg, Bremen, Lübeck, Salm, Arenberg, Oldenburg, parts of Westphalia, and Berg).
1810		The Principality of Bayreuth is sold to the Kingdom of Bavaria by France.
1810		The Rhodanic Republic is annexed by France and becomes the département of Simplon.
1811	28 March	The Kingdom of Haiti supersedes the State of Haiti. Cap-Haïtien is the capital.
1811	14 May	Paraguay gains independence from the Monarchy of Spain. Asunción is the capital.
1811	5 July	Venezuela declares independence from the Monarchy of Spain.
1811	27 November	The United Provinces of New Granada (modern Colombia) are established.
1811		The United Kingdom annexes the island of Java.
1812	14 May	France annexes Catalonia from Spain, creating the départements of Bouches-de-l'Èbre, Montserrat, Sègre, and Ter. Andorra is also annexed and incorporated into the département of Sègre.
1812	28 May	The eastern portion of the Principality of Moldavia (Bessarabia) is ceded to the Russian Empire by the Ottoman Empire in the Treaty of Bucharest.
1812	28 July	The First Republic of Venezuela is crushed by the Spanish Empire.
1813	23 July	The British Malta Colony supersedes the Malta Protectorate.
1813	7 August	The Second Republic of Venezuela is declared.
1813	12 October	Paraguay becomes the Republic of Paraguay.
1813	19 October	The Confederation of the Rhine is dissolved.
1813	26 October	The Kingdom of Westphalia is dissolved.
1813	2 December	The Sovereign Principality of the United Netherlands is created from the ruins of the first French Empire. Amsterdam is the capital.
1813	11 December	The Treaty of Valençay formally ends the Peninsular War, restoring Ferdinand VII of Spain and releasing the country from being a client state of the Napoleonic French Empire.
1814	14 January	The Kingdom of Norway secedes from Denmark–Norway. Christiania is the capital.
1814	29 March	The Netherlands are reestablished from France as the Sovereign Principality of the United Netherlands.
1814	6 April	The restored Kingdom of France supersedes the First French Empire.
1814	11 April	Napoleon Bonaparte abdicates from the Italian throne, effectively dissolving the Kingdom.
1814	17 May	The Kingdom of Sardinia reclaims its mainland territory and annexes the land of the former Republic of Genoa, a move which is ratified by the Congress of Vienna the following year.
1814	17 May	Denmark cedes Norway to Sweden through the Peace of Kiel.
1814	17 May	The Kingdom of Norway declares full independence, electing its own king and adopting its own constitution.
1814	2 October	The Monarchy of Spain reconquers Chile.
1814	4 November	The Kingdom of Norway joins a personal union with the Kingdom of Sweden. Stockholm and Christiania are the capitals.
1814		Various Italian states are reinstated, including the Duchy of Modena and Reggio and the Papal States.
1814		The Principality of Andorra declares independence from the First French Empire. Andorra la Vella is the capital.
1814		Java is returned from the United Kingdom to the Netherlands.
1815	2 March	The Kandyan Convention disestablishes the Kingdom of Kandy and establishes British Ceylon in Sri Lanka. Colombo is the capital.
1815	16 March	The United Kingdom of the Netherlands supersedes the Sovereign Principality of the United Netherlands. Amsterdam and Brussels are the joint capitals.
1815	20 March	The first French Empire supersedes the Kingdom of France.
1815	9 June	The Congress of Vienna results in the following geopolitical changes: The Kingdom of Lombardy–Venetia is formed from the Milanese and Venetian portions of the Kingdom of Italy and becomes a crown land of the Austrian Empire.; Austria gains the territory of the former Republic of Ragusa.; The Grand Duchy of Tuscany is re-established and given Piombino.; The Duchy of Lucca is created in place of the former Republic of Lucca.; The Duchy of Warsaw is partitioned into the Grand Duchy of Posen (Prussia), Congress Poland (Russia), and the Free City of Kraków (jointly controlled by Prussia, Russia, and Austria).; The Kingdom of Prussia is awarded Danzig, much of the Kingdom of Saxony, Westphalia, and the Rhineland.; The United Kingdom of the Netherlands is created from the former Dutch Republic and Austrian Netherlands, with Luxembourg in a personal union.; Swedish Pomerania is ceded to Prussia.; Hanover becomes the Kingdom of Hanover and annexes the former territories of the Bishop of Münster and East Frisia.; The Duchy of Lauenburg is ceded by Hanover to Denmark.; The Kingdom of Bavaria gains the Palatinate and parts of the Duchy of Würzburg and Grand Duchy of Frankfurt.; Hesse-Darmstadt gains Rhenish Hesse.; British control of various colonies, including the Cape Colony, Tobago, and Sri Lanka, is recognized.; The United States of the Ionian Islands is formed as a British protectorate.; The German Confederation is established. Frankfurt is the capital.
1815	29 June	The Federal League, an alliance of several Argentine Provinces and what is now Uruguay, is established.
1815	8 July	The restored Kingdom of France supersedes the first French Empire.
1815	21 November	Miloš Obrenović establishes the Principality of Serbia. Kragujevac is the capital.
1815	16 December	The United Kingdom of Portugal, Brazil and the Algarves supersedes the Kingdom of Portugal and the Algarves. Rio de Janeiro remains the capital-in-exile.
1815		The capital of Bermuda is moved from St George to Hamilton.
1816	9 July	The United Provinces in South America (Argentina, Bolivia, and Uruguay) declares its independence from the Monarchy of Spain. Buenos Aires remains the capital.
1816	6 May	The Spanish reconquest of New Granada ends the early Colombian independent governments.
1816		Shaka establishes the Zulu Kingdom in southern Africa.
1816		The Kingdom of the Two Sicilies is established from the merger of the Kingdom of Sicily with the Kingdom of Naples. Palermo is the capital.
1817	20 January	The United Kingdom of Portugal, Brazil and the Algarves occupies the Banda Oriental (Uruguay) as Cisplatina.
1817	12 February	The State of Chile declares its independence from the Monarchy of Spain. Santiago is the capital.
1817	5 April	The Battle of Maipú secures the independence of Chile from Spain.
1817		The capital of the Kingdom of the Two Sicilies is moved from Palermo to Naples.
1819	30 January	The Treaty of 1818 sets the 49th parallel north, west of the Lake of the Woods, as the international border between the United States of America and British North America, and also establishes the Oregon Country as a shared region.
1819	7 August	The United Provinces of New Granada gains independence from the Monarchy of Spain. Bogotá is the capital.
1819	17 December	Gran Colombia is established from the previous Second Republic of Venezuela, United Provinces of New Granada, and the Presidency of Quito.

=== 1820s ===
Year	Date	Event
1820	1 February	The Federal League defeats the central government of the United Provinces of the Río de la Plata in the Battle of Cepeda. The Federal League is dissolved and the Argentine Provinces resume their individual sovereignties, delegating their representation in foreign affairs to the Province of Buenos Aires.
1820	8 October	The Kingdom of Haiti collapses upon the suicide of King Henri I. Haiti is unified under the Republic of Haiti with its capital at Port-au-Prince.
1820		The Kingdom of Hawaiʻi establishes its capital at Lāhainā.
1820		The Trucial States emerge as a British protectorate.
1820		The Sultanate of Muscat and Oman is established from the merger of the Sultanate of Muscat and the Imamate of Oman.
1821	19 February	In the Adams–Onís Treaty, the United States of America and the Kingdom of Spain define a border between their North American possessions, leading to some land being swapped.
1821	25 March	Greece declares its independence from the Ottoman Empire. Nafplion is the capital.
1821	3 July	The United Kingdom of Portugal, Brazil and the Algarves returns the capital from exile in Rio de Janeiro, Brazil, to Lisbon.
1821	10 July	Spain formally cedes East Florida to the United States of America under the Adams–Onís Treaty.
1821	17 July	Spain formally cedes West Florida to the United States of America under the Adams–Onís Treaty.
1821	18 July	Cisplatina formally declares itself part of the United Kingdom of Portugal, Brazil and the Algarves.
1821	28 July	Peru declares its independence from the Kingdom of Spain. Lima is the capital.
1821	3 August	Peru becomes the State of Peru.
1821	24 August	The Monarchy of Spain recognizes the independence of the Mexican Empire.
1821	15 September	The Republic of Guatemala, the Republic of Honduras, the Republic of Nicaragua, and the Republic of El Salvador become independent from the Monarchy of Spain. Guatemala City, Comayagua, Managua, and San Salvador are the respective capitals.
1821	21 September	The Republic of Costa Rica gains independence from the Monarchy of Spain. Cartago is the capital.
1821	28 November	Panama gains independence from the Monarchy of Spain.
1821	December	Panama unites with Gran Colombia.
1821	1 December	The Republic of Spanish Haiti gains independence from the Monarchy of Spain. Santo Domingo is the capital.
1821		The Alaska Boundary Dispute between the Russian Empire and the United Kingdom begins.
1821		The Gold Coast is established as a British colony.
1822	9 February	Haiti annexes the Republic of Spanish Haiti. Santo Domingo yields to Port-au-Prince as the capital.
1822	7 September	The Independent Kingdom of Brazil declares its independence from the United Kingdom of Portugal, Brazil and the Algarves. Rio de Janeiro is the capital.
1822	12 October	The Empire of Brazil supersedes the Independent Kingdom of Brazil.
1822	19 December	The Peruvian Republic supersedes the State of Peru.
1823	16 May	The Republic of Costa Rica moves its capital from Cartago to San José.
1823	July	The Republic of Guatemala, the Republic of El Salvador, the Republic of Nicaragua, the Republic of Honduras, and the Republic of Costa Rica unite to form the Federal Republic of Central America. Guatemala City is the capital.
1823	4 October	The United Mexican States supersedes the Mexican Empire upon the execution of Agustín de Iturbide.
1823		The Emirate of Afghanistan follows the Durrani Empire. Kabul is the capital.
1824	2 July	The Confederation of the Equator declares independence from the Empire of Brazil. Recife is the capital, but the Confederation capitulates and is reabsorbed later in the year.
1824	6 August	Bolivia declares independence from the Monarchy of Spain and refuses to join either Peru or the United Provinces of South America.
1824	9 December	The Battle of Ayacucho ends the Spanish American wars of independence in South America.
1825	16 July	The border of the British colony of New South Wales is extended from 133°E to 129°E.
1825	6 August	The Bolivian Republic gains independence from the Monarchy of Spain at the conclusion of the Bolivian War of Independence. Chuquisaca (later Sucre) is the capital.
1825	25 August	Cisplatina declares its independence from the Empire of Brazil and reunites with the United Provinces of the Río de la Plata.
1825	29 August	The United Kingdom of Portugal, Brazil and the Algarves recognizes the independence of the Empire of Brazil.
1825	15 November	The United Kingdom of Portugal, Brazil and the Algarves changes its name back to the Kingdom of Portugal and the Algarves.
1825	3 December	Van Diemen's Land is declared a separate British colony to New South Wales.
1825		The Netherlands administratively combines its three colonies of Suriname, Curaçao and Dependencies (the ABC islands), and Sint Eustatius and Dependencies (the SSS islands). The capital is Paramaribo.
1826	8 February	The United Provinces of the Río de la Plata is proclaimed as a centralist and unitary state.
1826	9 July	The Republic of Chile supersedes the State of Chile.
1826	14 August	The Straits Settlements administrative unit is established and managed by the British East India Company. It consists of Penang, Dinding, Malacca, and Singapore.
1826		British Malaya is established and managed by the British East India Company.
1826		Following the First Anglo-Burmese War, Burma is forced to cede Assam, Manipur, Arakan, and Tenasserim to the British East India Company.
1826		The Duchy of Saxe-Coburg and Gotha is created from the merger of the Duchies of Saxe-Coburg and Saxe-Gotha. Coburg and Gotha are the respective capitals.
1827	14 June	The United Kingdom claims the Bonin Islands.
1827	18 August	The centralist and unitary state of the United Provinces of the Río de la Plata is dissolved. The Argentine Provinces resume their individual sovereignties, delegating their representation in foreign affairs to the Province of Buenos Aires.
1828	27 August	The Banda Oriental gains independence from the United Provinces of the Río de la Plata as the Government and Provisional General Captaincy of the Oriental State of Uruguay. Montevideo is the capital.
1828	27 August	The Misiones Orientales are awarded to the Empire of Brazil.
1828		The Kingdom of Vientiane is annexed by Siam.
1829		The British Swan River Colony is established in western Australia.

=== 1830s ===
Year	Date	Event
1830	3 February	The Ottoman Empire recognizes the independence of the First Hellenic Republic. Nafplio is the capital.
1830	13 May	The Republic of Ecuador and the Republic of Venezuela declare independence from Gran Colombia. Quito and Caracas are the respective capitals.
1830	28 June	The Oriental State of Uruguay is created from the Government and Provisional General Captaincy of the Oriental State of Uruguay.
1830	5 July	The Unitarian League is created among the Argentine provinces of San Luis, La Rioja, Catamarca, Mendoza, San Juan, Tucumán, Córdoba, Salta, and Santiago del Estero.
1830	4 October	Belgium declares its independence from the United Kingdom of the Netherlands. Brussels is the capital.
1830		France conquers the Regency of Algiers from the Ottoman Empire.
1831	4 January	The United Kingdom combines Essequibo-Demerara and Berbice as the Crown Colony of British Guiana. Georgetown is the capital.
1831	4 January	The Federal Pact is signed by the Province of Buenos Aires, the Province of Entre Ríos, and the Province of Santa Fe, beginning the Argentine Confederation.
1831	21 July	Belgium becomes the Kingdom of Belgium.
1831	9 August	The Province of Mendoza joins the Federal Pact.
1831	19 August	The Province of Corrientes joins the Federal Pact.
1831	20 August	The Province of Córdoba and the Province of Santiago del Estero join the Federal Pact.
1831	12 October	The Province of La Rioja joins the Federal Pact.
1831	20 October	The Republic of New Granada supersedes Gran Colombia.
1832	6 February	The colony of Western Australia supersedes the British Swan River Colony in Australia.
1832	13 April	The Province of San Luis joins the Federal Pact.
1832	May	The Kingdom of Greece supersedes the First Hellenic Republic.
1832	May	The Province of San Juan joins the Federal Pact.
1832	4 July	The Province of Salta joins the Federal Pact.
1832	8 July	The Province of Tucumán joins the Federal Pact.
1832	9 July	The Republic of Indian Stream declares independence from both the United States of America and the United Kingdom, as it was disputed territory.
1832	3 September	The Province of Catamarca joins the Federal Pact. End of the Unitarian League.
1833	3 January	The United Kingdom removes a garrison installed by the United Provinces of the Río de la Plata in October 1832, thereby reasserting its claim to sovereignty over the Falkland Islands. Port Louis becomes the capital.
1833		The Falkland Islands become a colony of the United Kingdom. Port Louis is the capital.
1834		The Republic of Maryland is established. Harper is the capital.
1834		The Federal Republic of Central America moves its capital from Guatemala City to San Salvador.
1834		The Kingdom of Greece moves its capital from Nafplio to Athens.
1835	5 August	The Republic of Indian Stream is annexed by the United States of America. (Note: Other sources note a resolution passed by the citizens of Indian Stream on April 2, 1836.)
1835	23 October	The Mexican Republic supersedes the United Mexican States.
1835	28 October	James Busby and 34 northern Māori chiefs sign He Whakaputanga resulting in the creation of the United Tribes of New Zealand. Its capital was Waitangi.
1836	2 March	The Republic of Texas declares its independence from Mexico. Washington-on-the-Brazos is the first of six cities that will serve as the temporary capital until 1839.
1836	17 March	The Republic of South Peru secedes from the Peruvian Republic. Cusco is the capital.
1836	11 August	The Republic of North Peru supersedes the Peruvian Republic.
1836	6 September	The Riograndense Republic declares independence from Brazil. Piratini is the first of five provisional capitals.
1836	28 October	The Republic of North Peru, the Republic of South Peru, and the Bolivian Republic unite to form the Peru-Bolivian Confederation. Tacna is the capital.
1836	28 December	The colony of South Australia is separated from the British colony of New South Wales.
1838	5 November	The Republic of Costa Rica, the Republic of Nicaragua, and the Republic of Honduras secede from the Federal Republic of Central America. San José, Managua, and Comayagua are the respective capitals.
1838	30 November	The United Kingdom annexes Pitcairn Island.
1839	20 January	Chile and Peruvian dissidents win decisevly the Battle of Yungay against the Peru–Bolivian Confederation, starting the fall of the union.
1839	19 April	The Grand Duchy of Luxembourg becomes independent, but remains in personal union with the Netherlands as a result of the Treaty of London.
1839	24 July	The Juliana Republic declares independence from Brazil. Laguna is the capital. The Republic capitulates and is reabsorbed later in the year.
1839	25 August	The Peruvian Republic and the Bolivian Republic are formed from the dissolution of the Peru-Bolivian Confederation. Lima and Sucre (previously Chuquisaca) are the respective capitals.
1839	17 October	The Republic of Texas establishes its permanent capital at Austin.
1839	17 November	The Republic of Guatemala secedes from the Federal Republic of Central America. Guatemala City is the capital.
1839		The Principality of Serbia moves its capital from Kragujevac to Belgrade.

=== 1840s ===
Year	Date	Event
1840	6 February	The Treaty of Waitangi is signed resulting in the disestablishment of the United Tribes of New Zealand.
1840	16 November	The colony of New Zealand is separated from the British colony of New South Wales.
1841	26 January	The United Kingdom conquers Hong Kong Island from the Qing dynasty.
1841	2 February	The sole remnant of the Federal Republic of Central America changes its name back to the Republic of El Salvador.
1841	10 February	The United Kingdom unites Upper Canada and Lower Canada as the Crown Colony of the United Province of Canada. Kingston is the capital.
1841	24 September	James Brooke establishes the Kingdom of Sarawak. Kuching is the capital.
1841	20 October	The Republic of Yucatán declares itself independent from Mexico. Mérida is the capital.
1842	10 November	The Webster–Ashburton Treaty comes into effect, ending several border disputes between the United States of America and the United Kingdom.
1844	27 February	The Dominican Republic gains independence from Haiti. Santo Domingo is the capital.
1844		The United Kingdom moves the capital of the Crown Colony of the United Province of Canada from Kingston to Montréal.
1845	1 March	The Riograndense Republic is reabsorbed by the Brazilian Empire as the province of Rio Grande do Sul again.
1845	29 December	The Republic of Texas joins the United States of America as the State of Texas. Austin yields to Washington as federal capital while remaining capital of the state.
1845		The Netherlands splits its colonial possessions in the Americas into two parts: Suriname and Curaçao and Dependencies. Paramaribo remains the capital of Suriname, while Willemstad on Curaçao becomes the capital of the six Caribbean islands.
1845		The Kingdom of Hawaiʻi moves its capital from Lāhainā to Honolulu.
1845		The United Kingdom moves the capital of the Falkland Islands from Port Louis to Stanley.
1846	17 February	The colony of North Australia is separated from the British colony of New South Wales.
1846	18 June	The Oregon Treaty establishes the 49th parallel north, from west of the Lake of the Woods, as the continental border between the Province of Canada and the United States of America.
1846	22 August	The United Mexican States supersedes the Mexican Republic.
1846	16 November	After the Kraków Uprising, the Free City of Cracow is annexed by the Austrian Empire.
1846	28 November	The British colony of North Australia is reincorporated back into the colony of New South Wales.
1846		The princely state of Kashmir and Jammu, ruled by the Dogra Dynasty, is created after the First Anglo-Sikh War, as per the Treaty of Amritsar.
1847	26 July	The African-American colony of Liberia declares its independence as the Republic of Liberia. Monrovia is the capital.
1848	2 February	The Mexican–American War ends with the Treaty of Guadalupe Hidalgo, by which the United Mexican States cedes all of its northernmost territories to the United States of America.
1848	24 February	The Second French Republic supersedes the Kingdom of France.
1848	5 December	The Grand Duchy of Posen is fully incorporated into the Kingdom of Prussia and becomes the Province of Posen.
1848		French Algeria is made an integral part of France.
1848		The Kazakh Khanate loses its sovereignty to the Russian Empire.
1849	9 February	Rebels under Giuseppe Garibaldi take over the area of the Papal States and create the Roman Republic.
1849	29 March	Following the Sikh defeat in the Second Anglo-Sikh War, the Sikh Empire falls and is merged with British India.
1849	14 April	The Hungarian State declares its independence from the Habsburg monarchy. Debrecen is the temporary capital.
1849	2 July	The Papal States are restored as Rome falls.
1849	13 August	The Hungarian State capitulates to the Austrian Empire and the former status quo is restored.
1849		The United Kingdom moves the capital of the Crown Colony of the United Province of Canada from Montréal to Toronto.

=== 1850s ===
Year	Date	Event
1850	9 December	The United Kingdom cedes less than one acre of underwater rock known as Horseshoe Reef in Lake Erie to the United States of America.
1851	11 January	Hong Xiuquan establishes the Taiping Heavenly Kingdom in China.
1851	1 May	The Argentine Provinces of Entre Ríos and Corrientes secede from the Argentine Confederation.
1851	1 July	The colony of Victoria is split off from the British colony of New South Wales.
1851		The Sultanate of Sulu becomes a protectorate of the Kingdom of Spain.
1852	17 January	The South African Republic (Republic of Transvaal) is established. Pretoria is the capital.
1852	3 February	The Battle of Caseros ends the Argentine Civil War. Entre Ríos and Corrientes rejoin the Argentine Confederation. The capital is moved to Paraná.
1852	11 September	The Province of Buenos Aires secedes from the Argentine Confederation as the State of Buenos Aires. Buenos Aires remains the capital, and the Confederation is without a capital until 1854.
1852	2 December	The Second French Empire supersedes the second Second French Republic.
1852		The United Kingdom moves the capital of the Crown Colony of the United Province of Canada from Toronto to the city of Québec.
1853	March	The Taiping Heavenly Kingdom establishes its capital at Tianjing.
1853	1 May	The Argentine Confederation becomes a federal republic renamed the Argentine Nation.
1853	24 June	The United States of America makes the Gadsden Purchase, buying a tract of land from Mexico which later becomes the extreme southern parts of the U.S. states of Arizona and New Mexico.
1854	23 February	The Orange Free State is established in southern Africa. Bloemfontein is the capital.
1854	24 March	The Argentine Confederation moves its capital to Paraná.
1855	7 February	Russians in north of Sakhalin Island, Japanese in south, with no defined border between. (Treaty of Shimoda)
1855	7 February	The Russian Empire recognizes Japanese sovereignty over the Kuril Islands from Iturup southwards (Treaty of Shimoda).
1856	1 January	The British colony of Van Diemen's Land changes its name to Tasmania.
1856	30 March	Southern Bessarabia (part of the territory annexed by the Russian Empire in 1812) returns to Moldavia by the Treaty of Paris (1856).
1856	28 October	The United States of America claims Baker Island and Jarvis Island under the Guano Islands Act.
1856		The United Kingdom moves the capital of the Crown Colony of the United Province of Canada from the city of Québec back to Toronto.
1856		The Sultanate of Zanzibar is established in East Africa.
1857		The Kingdom of Kongo becomes a vassal of the Kingdom of Portugal.
1857		The Republic of Maryland is annexed by Liberia.
1858	22 May	The Republic of New Granada becomes the Granadine Confederation.
1858	28 May	The Qing dynasty of China cedes what becomes known as Outer Manchuria to the Russian Empire by the Treaty of Aigun.
1858	2 August	The continental portion of Canada's part of Oregon Country is organized as the Colony of British Columbia.
1858	2 August	Following the Indian Rebellion of 1857, the Mughal Empire is dissolved, and the United Kingdom establishes British India by converting the former possessions of the British East India Company into a Crown Colony. Calcutta is the capital.
1858	31 August	The United States of America claims Navassa Island under the Guano Islands Act.
1858	3 December	The United States of America claims Howland Island under the Guano Islands Act.
1858		The United Kingdom moves the capital of the Crown Colony of the United Province of Canada from Toronto back to the city of Québec.
1859	24 January	Moldavia unites with Wallachia to form the United Principalities of Moldavia and Wallachia.
1859	6 June	Queen Victoria signs a proclamation separating the colony of Queensland from British New South Wales.
1859	6 September	The United States of America claims Johnston Atoll under the Guano Islands Act, disputing a claim by the Kingdom of Hawaii.
1859	10 November	By the Treaty of Zürich, the Austrian Empire cedes Lombardy from Lombardy–Venetia to France.
1859	10 November	France immediately cedes Lombardy to Kingdom of Sardinia. (Treaty of Zürich)
1859	11 November	Following the Battle of Cepeda, the State of Buenos Aires rejoins the Argentine Confederation.
1859	8 December	The Duchy of Parma, the Duchy of Modena and Reggio, the Grand Duchy of Tuscany, and the Papal Legations combine to form the Sardinian client state of the United Provinces of Central Italy.
1859	27 December	The United States of America claims Enderbury Island, McKean Island, Phoenix Island, and Starbuck Island.
1859	29 December	The United States of America claims Christmas Island and Malden Island under the Guano Islands Act.
1859		The United Kingdom moves the capital of the Crown Colony of the United Province of Canada from Québec back to Toronto.

=== 1860s ===
Year	Date	Event
1860	8 February	The United States of America claims Atafu, Birnie Island, Butaritari, Caroline Island, Fanning Island, Flint Island, Gardner Island, Canton Island, Kingman Reef, Manihiki, Marakei, Nukunono, Palmyra Atoll, Penrhyn, Pukapuka, Rakahanga, Swains Island, Sydney Island, Vostok Island, and Washington Island under the Guano Islands Act.
1860	22 March	The United Provinces of Central Italy are annexed by Kingdom of Sardinia.
1860	14 May	The United States of America claims Alto Velo Island under the Guano Islands Act.
1860	12 June	By the Treaty of Turin, the Second French Empire annexes the County of Nice from Kingdom of Sardinia.
1860	14 June	By the Treaty of Turin, the Second French Empire annexes Savoy from Kingdom of Sardinia.
1860	8 October	The Argentine Nation becomes the Argentine Republic.
1860	21 October	The Kingdom of Two Sicilies is annexed to Kingdom of Sardinia, except for the Fortress of Gaeta.
1860	4 November	The Kingdom of Sardinia annexes the Papal States of Umbria and The Marches.
1860	20 December	The State of South Carolina secedes from the United States of America, declaring itself the Republic of South Carolina.
1860		The British colony of South Australia's western border is changed from 132°E to 129°E.
1860		Kashmir and Jammu annexes Gilgit.
1861	9 January	The State of Mississippi secedes from the United States of America, declaring itself the Republic of Mississippi.
1861	10 January	The State of Florida secedes from the United States of America, declaring itself the Republic of Florida.
1861	11 January	The State of Alabama secedes from the United States of America, declaring itself the Alabama Republic.
1861	19 January	The State of Georgia secedes from the United States of America, as the independent State of Georgia.
1861	26 January	The State of Louisiana secedes from the United States of America, declaring itself the Republic of Louisiana.
1861	1 February	The State of Texas secedes from the United States of America, declaring itself the Republic of Texas.
1861	4 February	The Confederate States of America, formed from the seven seceding states, declare their independence from the United States of America. Montgomery, Alabama, is the capital for three months.
1861	13 February	Gaeta surrenders to the Kingdom of Sardinia.
1861	17 March	The Kingdom of Italy is proclaimed in place of the Kingdom of Sardinia.
1861	28 March	The Arizona Territory secedes from the United States of America.
1861	17 April	The Commonwealth of Virginia secedes from the United States of America and joins the Confederate States of America.
1861	6 May	The State of Arkansas secedes from the United States of America and joins the Confederate States of America.
1861	7 May	The State of Tennessee secedes from the United States of America and joins the Confederate States of America.
1861	20 May	The State of North Carolina secedes from the United States of America and joins the Confederate States of America.
1861	29 May	The Confederate States of America moves its capital from Montgomery, Alabama, to Richmond, Virginia.
1861	31 May	The Kingdom of Bahrain becomes a protectorate of the United Kingdom.
1861	17 September	Following the Battle of Pavón, the capital city of the Argentine Confederation is moved to Buenos Aires.
1861	31 October	A splinter government of the State of Missouri declares the state's secession from the United States of America.
1861	20 November	A splinter government of the State of Kentucky declares the state's secession from the United States of America.
1861	28 November	The splinter government of Missouri is admitted to the Confederate States of America.
1861	2 December	Paraná ceases to be the capital of the Argentine Confederation.
1861	10 December	The splinter government of Kentucky is admitted to the Confederate States of America.
1861	10 December	The Arizona Territory is annexed by the Confederate States of America as Confederate Arizona.
1861	12 December	The Argentine Republic supersedes the Argentine Confederation.
1861		The Dominican Republic returns to Spanish rule.
1861		The Principality of Monaco declares independence from the Second French Empire. Monaco itself is the capital.
1862	January	The Tokugawa shogunate of Japan claims the Bonin Islands, disputing a claim from the United Kingdom.
1862	12 April	The British colony of Queensland's western border is shifted from 141°E to 138°E.
1862	15 April	The Kingdom of Hawaii claims Palmyra Atoll, disputing a claim by the United States of America.
1862	8 October	Buenos Aires is declared the provisional capital of the Argentine Republic.
1862	12 October	The State of Buenos Aires reunites with the Argentine Republic.
1862	30 December	The United States of America claims the Swan Islands under the Guano Islands Act.
1862		The United Kingdom creates the colony British Honduras in Central America. The capital is Belize City.
1862		Cochinchina becomes a colony of France.
1863	8 May	The Granadine Confederation becomes the United States of Colombia.
1863	20 June	The Union-occupied northwestern counties of the Commonwealth of Virginia (which considers itself a part of the Confederate States of America) secede from the state and are admitted to the United States of America as the State of West Virginia.
1863	6 July	The British colony of South Australia annexes the Northern Territory from the colony of New South Wales.
1863	Summer	The Tokugawa shogunate of Japan rescinds its claim of the Bonin Islands, ending a dispute with the United Kingdom.
1863		Cambodia becomes a protectorate of France.
1864	10 April	The Mexican Empire supersedes the United Mexican States.
1864	21 May	The United Kingdom cedes the Ionian Islands to Greece.
1864	July	The Taiping Heavenly Kingdom is conquered by Qing China.
1864	7 October	The Russian Empire gains 350,000 square miles of territory at the expense of Chinese Xinjiang from the Qing Dynasty
1864	15 October	The United Kingdom claims Malden Island, disputing a claim by the United States of America.
1865	3 March	The Dominican Republic regains its independence from the Monarchy of Spain. Santo Domingo is the capital.
1865	3 April	The Confederate States of America moves its capital from Richmond to Danville, Virginia.
1865	11 April	The Confederate States of America capitulates and is reabsorbed by the United States of America, ending the American Civil War. The United States gradually readmits the eleven former Confederate states to full statehood between 24 July 1866 and 15 July 1870.
1865	14 August	Following the German-Danish War, the Kingdom of Prussia receives sole administration of the Duchy of Schleswig, while the Austrian Empire receives sole administration of Holstein. Prussia also acquires the Duchy of Saxe-Lauenburg from Austria.
1865		The Kingdom of Italy moves its capital from Turin to Florence.
1866	6 August	The United Kingdom unites the colonies of British Columbia and the Vancouver Island into a single colony. New Westminster yields to Victoria as the capital.
1866	10 August	Bolivia and Chile sign a treaty and agree to divide the disputed Atacama Desert on the 24° Parallel, establishing their international border.
1866	20 September	The Kingdom of Prussia annexes the Kingdom of Hanover, Holstein, Schleswig, Hesse-Kassel, Nassau, and Frankfurt
1866	22 October	The Kingdom of Italy annexes the Kingdom of Lombardy–Venetia. Venice yields to Florence as the capital.
1866	26 December	The United Kingdom claims Starbuck Island, disputing a claim by the United States of America.
1866		The United Kingdom moves the capital of the Crown Colony of the United Province of Canada from the city of Québec to Ottawa.
1866		The Kingdom of Prussia annexes the Duchy of Holstein.
1867	17 January	The United States of America relinquishes claims on Alto Velo Island.
1867	March	Congress Poland is incorporated into the Russian Empire as Vistula Land.
1867	1 April	The Straits Settlements become a Crown Colony of the United Kingdom.
1867	8 June	Austria-Hungary is established by a compromise of the Austrian Empire and the Kingdom of Hungary. The Grand Duchy of Transylvania becomes part of the Kingdom of Hungary by the same compromise.
1867	18 October	The Russian Empire sells Alaska to the United States of America.
1867	19 June	The United Mexican States supersedes the Second Mexican Empire.
1867	1 July	The United Kingdom unites its colonies of New Brunswick, Nova Scotia, and the Crown Colony of the United Province of Canada as the Dominion of Canada. Ottawa is the capital.
1867	1 July	The North German Confederation supersedes the German Confederation. Berlin remains the capital.
1867	8 July	The partially autonomous Khedivate of Egypt under Ismail Pasha replaces the Ottoman Egypt Eyalet.
1867	11 July	The Russian Empire establishes Russian Turkestan for the territories it has conquered in Central Asia.
1867	28 August	The United States of America claims Midway Atoll under the Guano Islands Act.
1867	11 November	After its defeat in the Bhutan War, Bhutan cedes parts of its territory to British India.
1868	3 January	Japan becomes the Empire of Greater Japan. The capital is moved from Kyoto to Edo, which is renamed Tokyo.
1868	9 July	The United Kingdom claims Caroline Island, disputing a claim by the United States of America.
1868	1 October	The Bolivian Republic changes its name to the Republic of Bolivia.
1868	11 December	The United States of America claims Serrana Bank under the Guano Islands Act.
1869	22 November	The United States of America claims Bajo Nuevo Bank, Pedro Cays, Quita Sueño Bank, and Roncador Bank under the Guano Islands Act.

=== 1870s ===
Year	Date	Event
1870	15 July	The Hudson's Bay Company transfers the North-Western Territory to Canada.
1870	20 July	The Crown Colony of British Columbia joins Canada.
1870	4 September	The French Third Republic supersedes the French Second Empire.
1870	20 September	Italy annexes the area around Rome, ending the Papal States, which are succeeded by the States of the Church.
1871	1 January	In the unification of Germany, the German Empire supersedes the North German Confederation after the accession of Bavaria, Württemberg, Baden, and Hesse. Berlin remains the capital.
1871	10 May	Germany annexes Moselle and most of Alsace from France following the Franco-Prussian War, which becomes the Imperial Territory of Alsace-Lorraine.
1871	20 July	British Columbia joins Canada.
1871		Rome replaces Florence as the capital of Italy.
1872	9 January	Limits between Paraguay and the Brazilian Empire are established following the Paraguayan War. Brazil enlarges its Mato Grosso region.
1872	21 October	An arbitration committee rules in favor of the United States of America in its territorial dispute with Canada over the San Juan Islands, ending the so-called Pig War.
1873	11 February	The First Spanish Republic supersedes the Monarchy of Spain.
1873	1 July	Prince Edward Island joins Canada.
1873	12 August	The Emirate of Bukhara becomes a protectorate of the Russian Empire.
1873	12 August	The Khanate of Khiva becomes a protectorate of the Russian Empire.
1873	17 November	With the unification of Buda, Óbuda, and Pest, Budapest becomes the capital of the Kingdom of Hungary.
1874	29 December	The restored Monarchy of Spain supersedes the first First Spanish Republic.
1874	1 January	The British East India Company is dissolved.
1875	7 May	By the Treaty of Saint Petersburg, the Empire of Japan cedes southern Sakhalin Island to Russia in exchange for the Kuril Islands north of Iturup.
1875		The Empire of Japan reclaims the Bonin Islands.
1876	3 February	Limits between Paraguay and Argentina are established following the Paraguayan War. Argentina is awarded the Central Chaco (current Formosa Province) and some territories in Misiones. The territories between the Pilcomayo River and Verde River are pending arbitration.
1876		The Russian Empire annexes the Khanate of Kokand.
1877	12 April	The United Kingdom annexes the South African Republic (Republic of Transvaal) as the Transvaal Colony.
1878	3 March	The Treaty of San Stefano results in the following territorial changes: The Principality of Bulgaria is established. Plovdiv is the capital.; The Ottoman Empire recognizes Montenegro and cedes it territory, including Nikšić, Podgorica, and Antivari.; Serbia gains independence and annexes Niš and Leskovac.; The Ottoman Empire recognizes the independence of the Principality of Romania.; Russia cedes Northern Dobruja to Romania (which had been ceded to Russia by the Ottoman Empire).; Romania cedes Southern Bessarabia to Russia.; The Ottoman Empire cedes Armenian and Georgian territories in the Caucasus to Russia, including Ardahan, Artvin, Batum, Kars, Olti, Beyazit, and Alashkert.; The Vilayet of Bosnia becomes an autonomous province.; Crete, Epirus, and Thessaly are awarded limited self-government.
1878	21 May	Romania gains independence from the Ottoman Empire. Bucharest is the capital.
1878	12 July	The Ottoman Empire leases Cyprus as a protectorate to the United Kingdom.
1878	13 July	The Treaty of Berlin results in the following territorial changes: The Principality of Bulgaria moves its capital from Plovdiv to Sofia.; The Principality of Bulgaria is shrunk significantly.; Eastern Rumelia is created as an autonomous province of the Ottoman Empire.; The Austro-Hungarian occupation of the Vilayet of Bosnia (Bosnia and Herzegovina) is recognized; the territory is de facto under Austro-Hungarian rule.; The Ottoman Empire cedes Thessaly and small parts of Epirus to Greece.; Alashkerd and Bayazid are returned to the Ottoman Empire.
1878	8 September	The United States of America claims Arenas Key, claimed by Mexico; the Morant Cays; and Serranilla Bank, claimed by Colombia, under the Guano Islands Act.
1878	12 November	The territories between the Pilcomayo River and Verde River, claimed by Argentina and Paraguay, are awarded to Paraguay in an arbitration by U.S. President Rutherford B. Hayes.
1878		Argentina begins its campaign to take control of Patagonic territories. By the end of 1879, Argentina's control extends as far as the Río Negro (modern provinces of Río Negro and La Pampa, as well as southern Mendoza, San Luis, Córdoba, and Buenos Aires Provinces).
1879	14 February	Chile occupies the city of Antofagasta, previously controlled by Bolivia but with a majority of Chilean population. The War of the Pacific starts with Bolivia, later with Peru. Chile also occupies the rest of the ports in the coast north to Antofagasta to the Loa River afterwards. Bolivia loses direct access to the Pacific Ocean.
1879	23 March	Chile occupies Calama from Bolivia after the Battle of Topáter.
1879	27 March	The Ryukyu Kingdom is annexed by the Japanese Empire.
1879	26 July	The United States of America claims Western Triangle Island, already claimed by Mexico, under the Guano Islands Act.
1879		Portugal establishes the colony of Portuguese Guinea from the union of the territories Bissau and Cacheu.
1879	2 November	The first organic amphibious landing in military history happens in the Battle of Pisagua in which Chile occupies the port in Tarapacá, then Peru.

=== 1880s ===
Year	Date	Event
1880	30 October	The Republic of Honduras moves its capital from Comayagua to Tegucigalpa, ending a century of indecision as to the country's capital.
1880	6 December	Buenos Aires is declared the official capital of the Argentine Republic.
1880		The French Republic establishes the protectorate of French Congo. Brazzaville is the capital.
1881	17 January	Chile starts the Occupation of Lima, Peru, during the War of the Pacific that lasts until October 23, 1883
1881	14 March	The Kingdom of Romania is proclaimed. Bucharest is the capital.
1881	23 July	The border between the Republic of Chile and the Argentine Republic is defined diving Patagonia and Tierra del Fuego for both countries which previously disputed most of the territory, while recognizing the Strait of Magellan as a Chilean water body but with a free access regime to all nations.
1881	3 August	The South African Republic (Republic of Transvaal) regains self-governance under British suzerainty.
1881		Tunisia becomes a French protectorate.
1881		The United Kingdom claims Flint Island, disputing a claim by the United States of America.
1882	6 March	The Kingdom of Serbia supersedes the Principality of Serbia.
1882	1 June	The United Kingdom annexes Morant Cays and Pedro Cays as part of Jamaica.
1883	20 October	Chile gains Tarapacá permanently, and Arica, and Tacna from Peru (Treaty of Ancón). Arica and Tacna are subject to a future referendum in 10 years, which doesn't happen.
1883		Argentina incorporates the Patagonian lands of modern Neuquén Province to the Limay River.
1883		The Kingdom of Loango is annexed to French Congo.
1883		Cabinda becomes a protectorate of the Kingdom of Portugal.
1884	4 April	Chile regains Antofagasta from Bolivia legally as part of the truce ending the War of the Pacific (made permanent in 1904).
1884	21 June	The United States of America claims Alacrans Islands, already claimed by Mexico, under the Guano Islands Act.
1884	3 August	The British suzerainty in the South African Republic (Republic of Transvaal) ends.
1884	18 October	Argentina ends the conquest campaign of Eastern Patagonia, subduing the remaining Amerindian resistance in the modern Provinces of Chubut and Santa Cruz.
1884	15 November	The Congo Conference in Berlin forms the basis for the division of Africa into colonies in the subsequent Scramble for Africa.
1884		The Greenwich prime meridian becomes the international standard reference for the determination of longitude by cartographers.
1884		German South-West Africa is created.
1884		German East Africa is created.
1884		Togoland is created.
1884		Kamerun is created.
1884		German New Guinea is created and administered by the German New Guinea Company.
1884		The United Kingdom establishes the Crown Colony of the Territory of Basutoland. Maseru is the capital.
1884		The United Kingdom establishes the British Somaliland Protectorate. Hargeisa is the capital.
1884		Annam and Tonkin become protectorates of France.
1885	2 May	King Leopold II of Belgium establishes the Congo Free State, a private government run by the International African Association.
1885	1 September	The United Kingdom establishes the Crown Colony of British Bechuanaland. Vryburg is the capital.
1885	6 September	The Principality of Bulgaria annexes Eastern Rumelia.
1885	29 November	The Third Anglo-Burmese War ends with the fall of the Konbaung dynasty in Burma.
1885	December	Peru manages to retain the town of Ticalaco which was considered to the south of the Sama River (defined as the border in the Ancon Treaty) by Chile but not by Peru. The Ticalaco River becomes the border in that part of the territory in the Tacna Province.
1886	1 January	Burma becomes part of British India.
1886	1 May	King Leopold II of Belgium selects Boma as the capital of his Congo Free State.
1886		The United States of Colombia becomes the Republic of Colombia.
1887	17 October	The colony of French Indochina is established. Saigon is the capital.
1887	16 December	The Sultanate of Maldives becomes a British Protectorate.
1887		The Kingdom of Lunda is disestablished.
1887		Macau officially becomes a colony of Portugal.
1888	15 March	The United Kingdom annexes Fanning Island, which was previously claimed by the United States of America.
1888	17 March	The United Kingdom claims Christmas Island, disputing a claim by the United States of America.
1888	9 September	Chile incorporates Easter Island by signing a mutual will agreement with the island leader.
1888	26 October	The United Kingdom makes the Cook Islands a protectorate. This also creates a dispute with the United States of America on the atolls of Pukapuka, Manihiki, Penrhyn, and Rakahanga.
1888		The Sultanate of Maguindanao falls after Mindanao is conquered by the Kingdom of Spain.
1888		The Bruneian Empire becomes a protectorate of the United Kingdom.
1888		The Kingdom of Sarawak becomes a protectorate of the United Kingdom.
1888		The United States of America claims Minami-Tori-shima using the Guano Islands Act.
1889	9 March	Emperor Menelik II of Ethiopia moves his capital to Addis Ababa.
1889	19 May	Argentina renounces to its claim over Tarija in exchange to Bolivia renouncing over its claim over Puna de Atacama in the Quirno Costa-Vaca Guzmán treaty.
1889	29 May	The United Kingdom annexes Washington Island, which was previously claimed by the United States of America.
1889	3 June	The United Kingdom claims Jarvis Island, disputing a claim by the United States of America.
1889	19 June	Anglo-Egyptian Sudan is established as a colony of the United Kingdom.
1889	26 June	The United Kingdom claims Sydney Island, disputing a claim by the United States of America.
1889	29 June	The United Kingdom claims Phoenix Island, disputing a claim by the United States of America.
1889	10 July	The United Kingdom claims Birnie Island, disputing a claim by the United States of America.
1889	15 November	The Republic of the United States of Brazil supersedes the Empire of Brazil.
1889		The Kingdom of Luba is annexed to the Congo Free State.
1889		The United Kingdom establishes the Crown Colony of Trinidad and Tobago from the colonies of Trinidad and Tobago.

=== 1890s ===
Year	Date	Event
1890	1 July	Heligoland is ceded by the United Kingdom to the German Empire.
1890	7 November	Zanzibar becomes a protectorate of the United Kingdom.
1890	29 November	End of the personal union between the Kingdom of the Netherlands and the Grand Duchy of Luxembourg.
1891		Pratap Singh defeats the ruler of Chitral and forces Hunza and Nagar to accept the suzerainty of Kashmir and Jammu state.
1892	8 March	The United Kingdom annexes the Gilbert Islands as a protectorate. This takes the islands of Butaritari and Marakei from the existing United States of America claim.
1892	27 May	The United Kingdom claims Gardner Island, disputing a claim by the United States of America.
1892		The Sultanate of Muscat and Oman becomes a protectorate of the United Kingdom.
1893	23 February	The Nyasalands Districts Protectorate is renamed to the British Central Africa Protectorate of the United Kingdom. Zomba is the capital.
1893	1 May	Argentina and Chile agree to move their border in Tierra del Fuego 11.3 km to the west signing a protocol, as well as recognizing the coast of the Última Esperanza Province as Chilean in nowadays Puerto Natales.
1893	3 October	France conquers the Kingdom of Luang Phrabang from Siam and makes it part of French Indochina.
1894	11 April	The Kingdom of Buganda becomes a protectorate named Uganda of the United Kingdom. Entebbe is the capital.
1894	4 July	The Republic of Hawaii supersedes the Kingdom of Hawaiʻi.
1894	17 November	The United States of America rescinds its claims to the Alacrans Islands, Arenas Key, and Western Triangle Island, which were disputed with Mexico.
1895	5 February	The border between the Republic of the United States of Brazil and the Argentine Republic is arbitrated by U.S. President Grover Cleveland.
1895	17 April	The Qing dynasty of China cedes Taiwan to the Empire of Japan by the Treaty of Shimonoseki.
1895	23 May	The Republic of Formosa declares independence upon its annexation by the Empire of Japan. Taipei is the capital.
1895	June	The Republic of Formosa moves its capital from Taipei to Tainan.
1895	15 June	The United Kingdom establishes the East Africa Protectorate. Mombasa is the capital.
1895	23 October	The Empire of Japan conquers the Republic of Formosa. Taiwan becomes a Japanese colony under the name Takasago Koku. Taihoku is the capital.
1895	27 October	France creates French West Africa. Saint-Louis is the capital.
1895	16 November	The United Kingdom annexes the Crown Colony of British Bechuanaland to the Cape Colony. Vryburg yields to Cape Town as the capital.
1895		The United Kingdom establishes the Federated Malay States as a protectorate from a number of British-dominated Sultanates on the Malay Peninsula. Kuala Lumpur is the capital.
1897	28 February	French Madagascar supersedes the Malagasy Protectorate following the exile of Ranavalona III.
1897		The Zulu Kingdom becomes part of the British Colony of Natal.
1897		The Joseon Dynasty becomes the Korean Empire.
1897	9 February	The United Kingdom invades the Kingdom of Benin and annexes it as part of its Niger Coast Protectorate.
1898	29 May	After occupying the territory on April 22, France forces Qing China to lease it Guangzhouwan for a period of 99 years.
1898	12 June	The Philippine Republic declares independence from the Kingdom of Spain. Malolos is the capital.
1898	9 June	Through the Convention for the Extension of Hong Kong Territory, Qing China lends New Territories to the United Kingdom for a period of 99 years.
1898	24 July	The Empire of Japan annexes Minami-Tori-shima, disputing a prior claim by the United States of America.
1898	25 July	The United States of America seizes control of Puerto Rico from the Spanish Empire during the Spanish–American War.
1898	12 August	The United States of America annexes the Republic of Hawaii as the Territory of Hawaii.
1898	2 November	The Puna de Atacama dispute is resolved by arbitration: of the 75,000 km^{2} in dispute, 64,000 km^{2}, 85%, is awarded to the Argentina and 11,000 km^{2}, 15%, to the Republic of Chile.
1898	10 December	The Spanish–American War concludes with the Treaty of Paris, by which the Monarchy of Spain cedes four of its dependencies to the United States of America: The Captaincy General of Cuba. Havana is the capital.; The Captaincy General of Puerto Rico. San Juan is the capital.; The Captaincy General of the Philippines. Manila is the Spanish capital. (The Philippine Republic maintains its sovereignty with Malolos as its capital.); The Island of Guam.
1898		The Republic of Bolivia moves its administrative capital from Sucre to La Paz. Sucre remains the constitutional and judicial capital.
1899	17 January	The United States of America claims Wake Island.
1899	23 January	The Sheikhdom of Kuwait becomes a protectorate of the United Kingdom.
1899	12 February	The German–Spanish Treaty is signed by the German Empire and the Kingdom of Spain. The treaty involved Spain selling the Bismarck Archipelago, Bougainville Island, Buka Island, Caroline Islands (including Palau) and the Mariana Islands to Germany for 25 million pesetas (17 million marks). Germany's new territories were put under the jurisdiction of German New Guinea.
1899	14 July	The first Republic of Acre declares independence from Bolivia. The capital is Antimary.
1899	2 December	Following the Tripartite Convention: The Kingdom of Samoa is partitioned between German Samoa and American Samoa.; The islands east and southeast of Bougainville belonging to German New Guinea are ceded to the British Solomon Islands.; The neutral zone in West Africa is split between British Gold Coast and German Togoland.
1899		The German Empire takes over the administration of German New Guinea from the German New Guinea Company.

== Maps ==
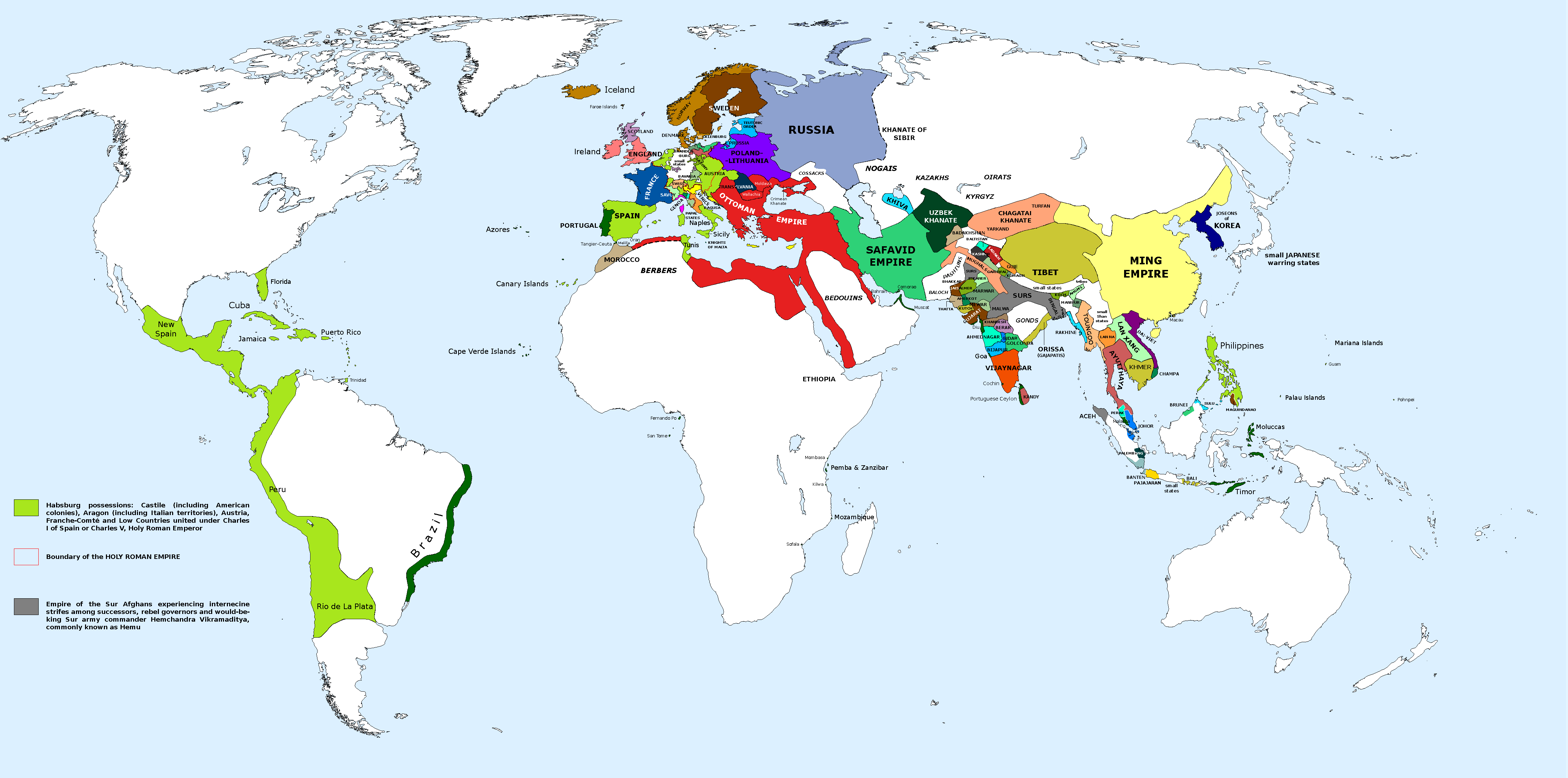
World in 1555–1556

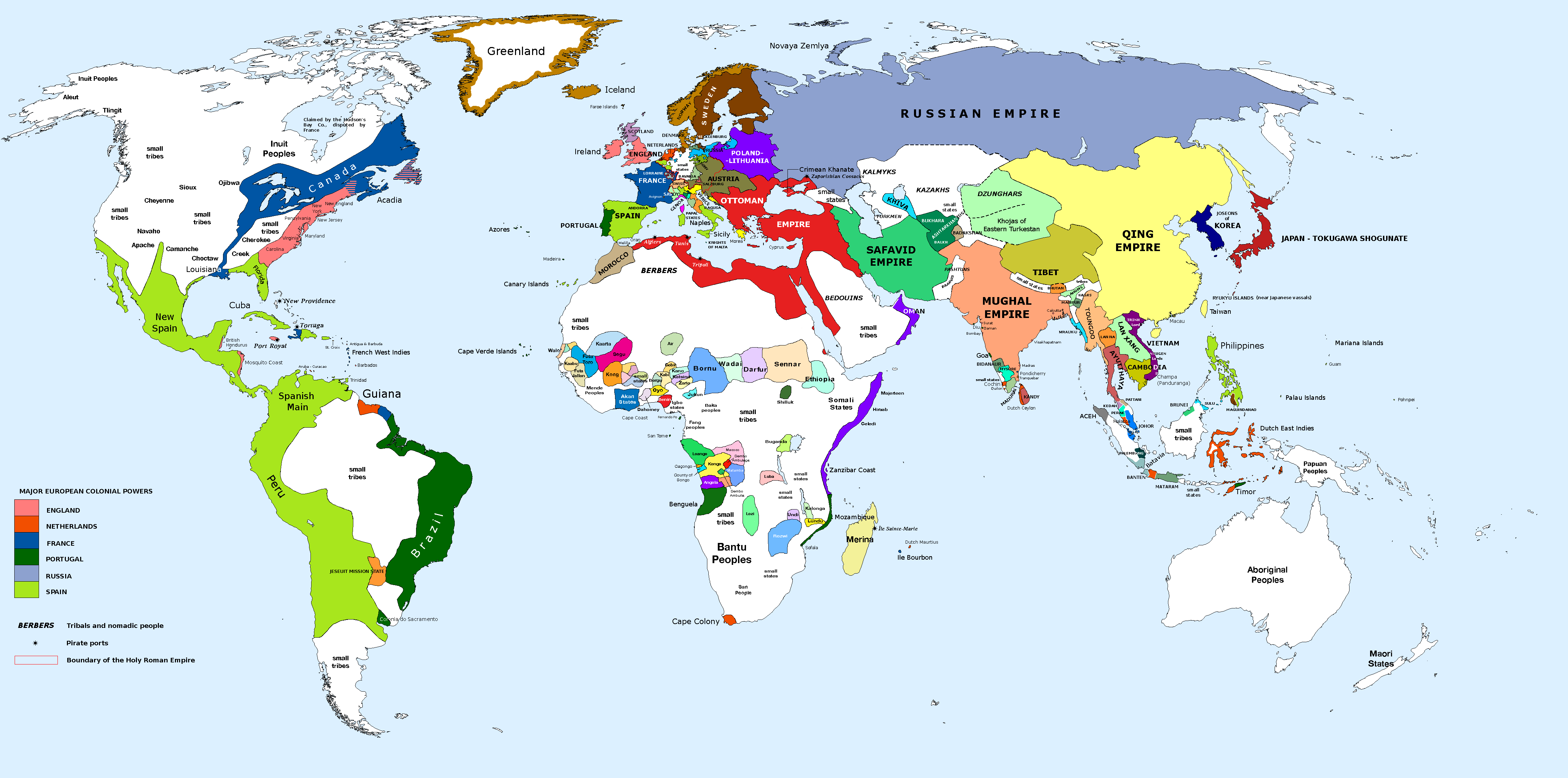
World in 1700

== See also ==
- Timeline of national independence
- Geopolitics – Study of geography's effects on politics
- List of administrative division name changes
- List of city name changes
- List of national border changes (1914–present)
- Lists of political entities by century
- Sovereign state – State having the highest authority over a territory
  - List of former sovereign states
  - List of sovereign states
  - List of sovereign states by date of formation
  - List of sovereign states and dependent territories by continent
- Political history of the world

== Bibliography ==
- Beck, Roger B. (2008). Black, Linda; Krieger, Larry S.; Naylor, Phillip C.; Shabaka, Dahia Ibo (eds.). World History: Patterns of Interaction.
- Chavez, Thomas E. (2003). Spain and the Independence of the United States: An Intrinsic Gift. University of New Mexico Press.
- Kuroda, Nagahisa (1954). "Report on a trip to Marcus Island, with notes on the birds". Pacific Science. 8 (1).
- Marley, David F. (1998). Wars of the Americas: A Chronology of Armed Conflict in the New World, 1492 to the Present. Santa Barbara, CA: ABC-CLIO. ISBN 0874368375.
- Marley, David F. (2005). "Bahamas". Historic Cities of the Americas: An Illustrated Encyclopedia. Vol. 1: The Caribbean, Mexico, and Central America. Santa Barbara, CA: ABC-CLIO. pp. 3–15. ISBN 1576070271.
- Moore, John Bassett (1906). A Digest of International Law as Embodied in Diplomatic Discussions, Treaties and Other International Agreements, International Awards, the Decisions of Municipal Courts, and the Writings of Jurists and Especially in Documents, Published and Unpublished, Issued by Presidents and Secretaries of State of the United States, the Opinions of the Attorneys-General, and the Decisions of Courts, Federal and State. Washington, DC: U.S. Government Printing Office. Archived from the original on May 1, 2016.
- Panton, Kenneth J. (2015). "Chronology". Historical Dictionary of the British Empire. London: Rowman & Littlefield. ISBN 978-0-8108-7524-1. Archived from the original on April 8, 2016.
- Slade, William (1823). Vermont state papers; being a collection of records and documents, connected with the assumption and establishment of government by the people of Vermont; together with the journal of the Council of safety, the first constitution, the early journals of the General assembly, and the laws from the year 1779 to 1786, inclusive. To which are added the Proceedings of the first and second Councils of censors. Middlebury, Vermont: J.W. Copeland, Printer.
