= Poggio Umbricchio =

- Frazione
- Location of Poggio Umbricchio in Italy
- Coordinates: 42°33′42″N 13°33′06″E
- Country: Italy
- Region: Abruzzo
- Province: Teramo (TE)
- Comune: Crognaleto
- Elevation: 716 m (2,349 ft)
- Demonym: Poggiani
- Time zone: UTC+1 (CET)
  - Summer (DST): UTC+2 (CEST)
- Postal code: 64040
- Dialing code: 0861

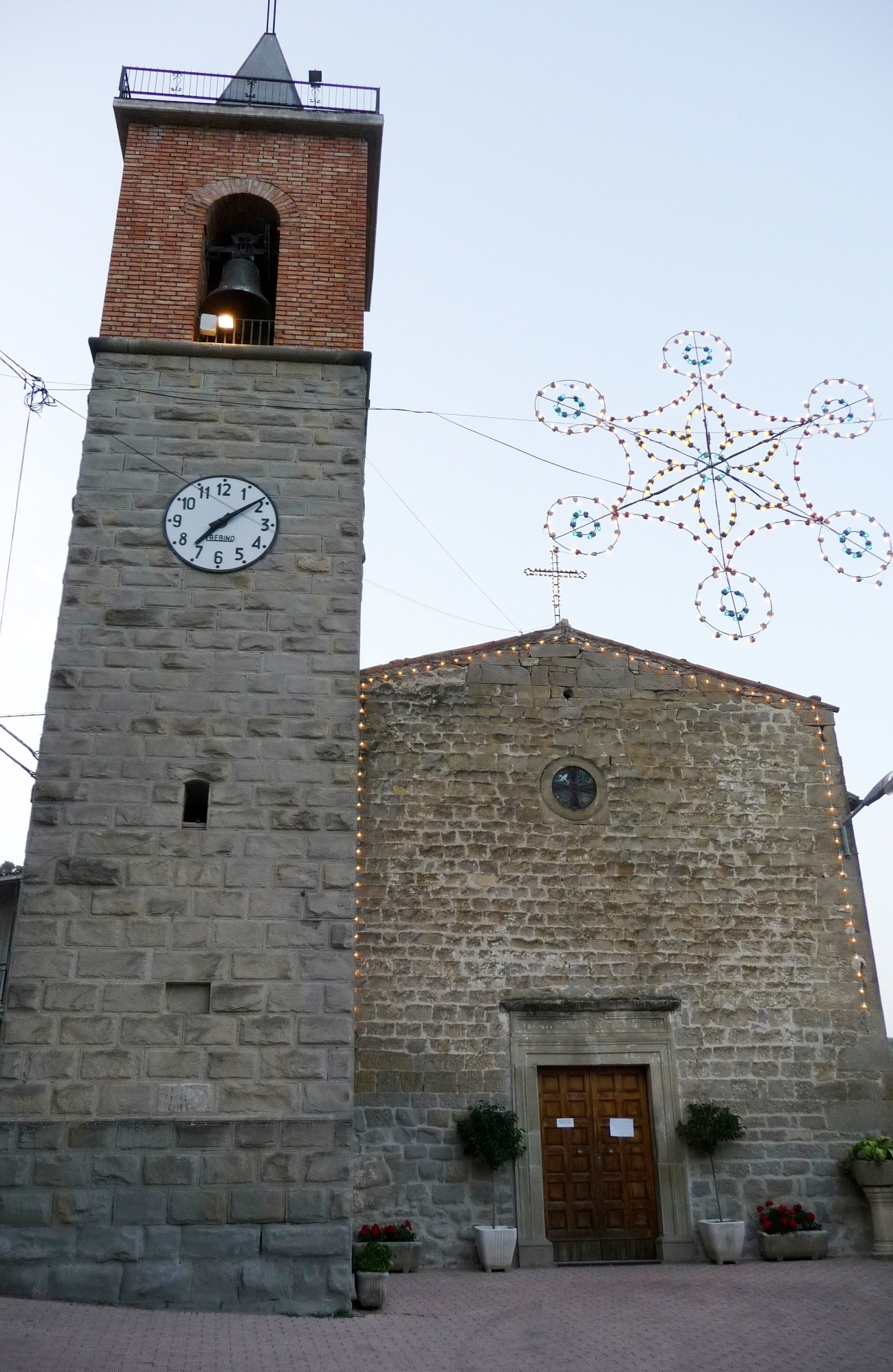

Poggio Umbricchio is a frazione of Crognaleto in the Province of Teramo in the Abruzzo region of Italy. It is a medieval village.

The settlement is perched on a steep rock spur, on the left side of the Vomano river.

== See also ==
- Senarica
