= Figliola =

- Frazione
- Location of Figliola in Italy
- Coordinates: 42°35′30.09″N 13°30′49.45″E
- Country: Italy
- Region: Abruzzo
- Province: Teramo (TE)
- Comune: Teramo
- Time zone: UTC+1 (CET)
  - Summer (DST): UTC+2 (CEST)

Figliola is a frazione (outlying area) of the comune of Crognaleto, in the Province of Teramo within the Abruzzo Region of Italy. It is between the towns of Crognaleto, San Giorgio and Aiello in the Vomano Valley. Figliola faces the Gran Sasso and can be reached via a road that is partially paved.

According to some historians, the village takes its name from the Italian word Filiola meaning a small stream of water. At one time, the village was part of the feudal holdings of the Dukes of Atri. During the 17th century, the village, likely, served as a refuge for brigand soldiers while their leaders took shelter in the a nearby castle in San Giorgio. During some of the fiercer skirmishes, the brigand likely fled to the Papal States just north in what today is Italy's Marche Region. In 1804, only 36 people lived in the village. Nine years later Figliola was assigned to the comune of Crognaleto. Today, the village is uninhabited.

Most of the houses in the village are constructed of stone. Although few people visit the village in the winter, several families have restored houses that serve as summer homes and are used primarily in the summer months.

For religious purposes, Figliola belonged to the church parish of Macchia Vomano. The village church is dedicated to Saint Mary Madelene.

== Bibliography ==
- Giulio Di Nicola, Figliola, in La Gazzetta di Teramo, Teramo, 19 ottobre 1975, p. 1. (in Italian)
- Figliola, in La valle dell'alto Vomano e dei Monti della Laga, Teramo, Fondazione Cassa di Risparmio della Provincia di Teramo, 1991, (Documenti dell’Abruzzo teramano, serie 3, collana diretta da Luisa Franchi dell’Orto), vol. III-2, p. 467. (in Italian)
