= List of lighthouses in the Dominican Republic =

This is a list of lighthouses in the Dominican Republic.

== Lighthouses ==
Name	Image	Year built	Location & coordinates	Class of light	Focal height	NGA number	Admiralty number	Range nml
Cabo Engaño Lighthouse	Image	1990s	Punta Cana; 18°34′01.3″N 68°19′34.6″W	Fl W 5 s.	43 metres (141 ft)	14296	J5444	11
Cabo Frances Viejo Lighthouse	Image	2000s	María Trinidad Sánchez Province; 19°39′58.9″N 69°56′13.4″W	L Fl W 10s.	50 metres (160 ft)	14272	J5434	18
Cabo Samana Lighthouse		1915 est.	Samaná Peninsula; 19°18′03.5″N 69°09′10.4″W	Fl W 5s.	141 metres (463 ft)	14280	J5738	10
Cabras Island Lighthouse		1800s	Monte Cristi Province; 19°53′22.4″N 71°40′07.2″W	L Fl W 12s.	34 metres (112 ft)	14248	J5426	13
Cayo Arenas Lighthouse		1940s est.	offshore Monte Cristi; 19°52′11.7″N 71°51′51.1″W	L Fl W 6s.	20 metres (66 ft)	14240	J5422	13
Cayo Vigna Lighthouse		n/a	Samaná Bay; 19°11′42.6″N 69°19′39.5″W	F R	7 metres (23 ft)	14288	J5440.5	8
Isla Alto Velo Lighthouse	Image	1915 est.	Alto Velo Island; 17°28′26.6″N 71°38′27.7″W	Fl (2) W 10s.	163 metres (535 ft)	14388	J5482	13
Isla Saona Lighthouse		n/a	Saona Island; 18°06′43.9″N 68°34′25.5″W	Fl W 10s.	32 metres (105 ft)	14304	J5446	16
La Romana Lighthouse	Image	1960s	La Romana; 18°24′54.6″N 68°57′30.5″W	Fl W 6s.	27 metres (89 ft)	14312	J5448	15
Puerto Liberator Lighthouse	Image	1948 est.	Pepillo Salcedo; 19°42′35.9″N 71°44′35.3″W	Iso R 20s.	15 metres (49 ft)	14244	J5424	10
Puerto Plata Lighthouse	Image	1879	Puerto Plata; 19°48′10.9″N 70°41′40.6″W	L Fl W 6s.	42 metres (138 ft)	14260	J5430	18
Puerto Plata Sector Lighthouse	Image	n/a	Puerto Plata; 19°47′56.2″N 70°42′13.2″W	F WRG	11 metres (36 ft)	14265	J5431.1	9
Punta Balandra Lighthouse		n/a	Samaná Bay; 19°10′48.4″N 69°13′54.3″W	Fl W 4s:	47 metres (154 ft)	14284	J5440	10
Punta Laguna Lighthouse		n/a	Saona Island; 18°08′13.8″N 68°45′23.2″W	Fl W 10s.	14 metres (46 ft)	14308	J5447	10
Punta Nibison Lighthouse		n/a	Lagunas de Nisibón; 18°58′24.7″N 68°46′32.3″W	Fl (2) W 10s.	15 metres (49 ft)	14292	J5442	12
Punta Palenque Lighthouse		n/a	Peravia Province; 18°13′49.4″N 70°09′22.3″W	Fl W 7s.	14 metres (46 ft)	14360	J5466	12

== See also ==
- Lists of lighthouses and lightvessels
