= Senarica =

Frazione in Abruzzo, Italy and former republic

- Frazione
- Location of Senarica in Italy
- Coordinates: 42°32′51″N 13°30′50″E
- Country: Italy
- Region: Abruzzo
- Province: Teramo (TE)
- Comune: Crognaleto

Population
  - Total: 300
- Time zone: UTC+1 (CET)
  - Summer (DST): UTC+2 (CEST)

Senarica (in Old Italian: Sinarcho) is a frazione (hamlet or village) of the comune (municipality) of Crognaleto, located along the Italian state road Strada statale 80 del Gran Sasso d'Italia (SS 80), west of Teramo City, in the Province of Teramo, in the Abruzzo region of central Italy. It has a population of fewer than 300 people. The Vomano River flows nearby and the village stands prominently on a spur overlooking the gorges of the river.

== History ==
Republic of Senarica Repubblica di Senarica (Italian)
- 1343–1797
- Flag Coat of arms
- Status: Microstate
- Capital: Senarica
- Common languages: Italian
- Religion: Roman Catholic
- Government: Republic
- Head
  - 1356–?: Hyacinth Tsitsinto I
- Historical era: Early modern
  - Established: 1343
  - Disestablished: 1797
Preceded by	Succeeded by
Kingdom of Naples	Kingdom of Naples
- Today part of: Italy

The settlement of Senarica, formerly known as Sinarcho, dates back to the pre-Romanesque period. Located near a route that, according to some studies, has been identified with the Via Caecilia, which from Rome passed through Amiternum and crossed the Apennines to reach Atri near the Port of Cerrano, it formed part in the medieval period of the territory of Poggio Ramonte from Angevin times onward.

A local legend holds that Senàrica and the neighbouring village Poggio Umbricchio became independent in circa 1343, when Queen Joanna I of Naples granted the area independence because of the inhabitants' fierce opposition against the enemy troops of Milan under Lord Luchino I Visconti's relative Ambrogio Visconti. Impressed by the splendor of the dogal Republic of Venice, Senàrica rulers adopted a similar republican government, with an elected doge as head of state.

The locality begins to appear in archival sources only from the early 16th century, closely linked to the territory held by the lords of the same name, who dominated the area from the mid-14th century together with Poggio Umbricchio in the upper Vomano Valley. Their domain extended, even after part of it was ceded to Fano Adriano, from the borders with Montorio and Roseto to the slopes of the Teramo side of the Gran Sasso d'Italia.

The king of Naples Ferdinand IV did not believe in the existence of the independent republic and sent some officials to Senàrica for investigation. Driven by Prime Minister Bernardo Tanucci, he ordered its annexation in 1797.

== Monuments and places of interest ==
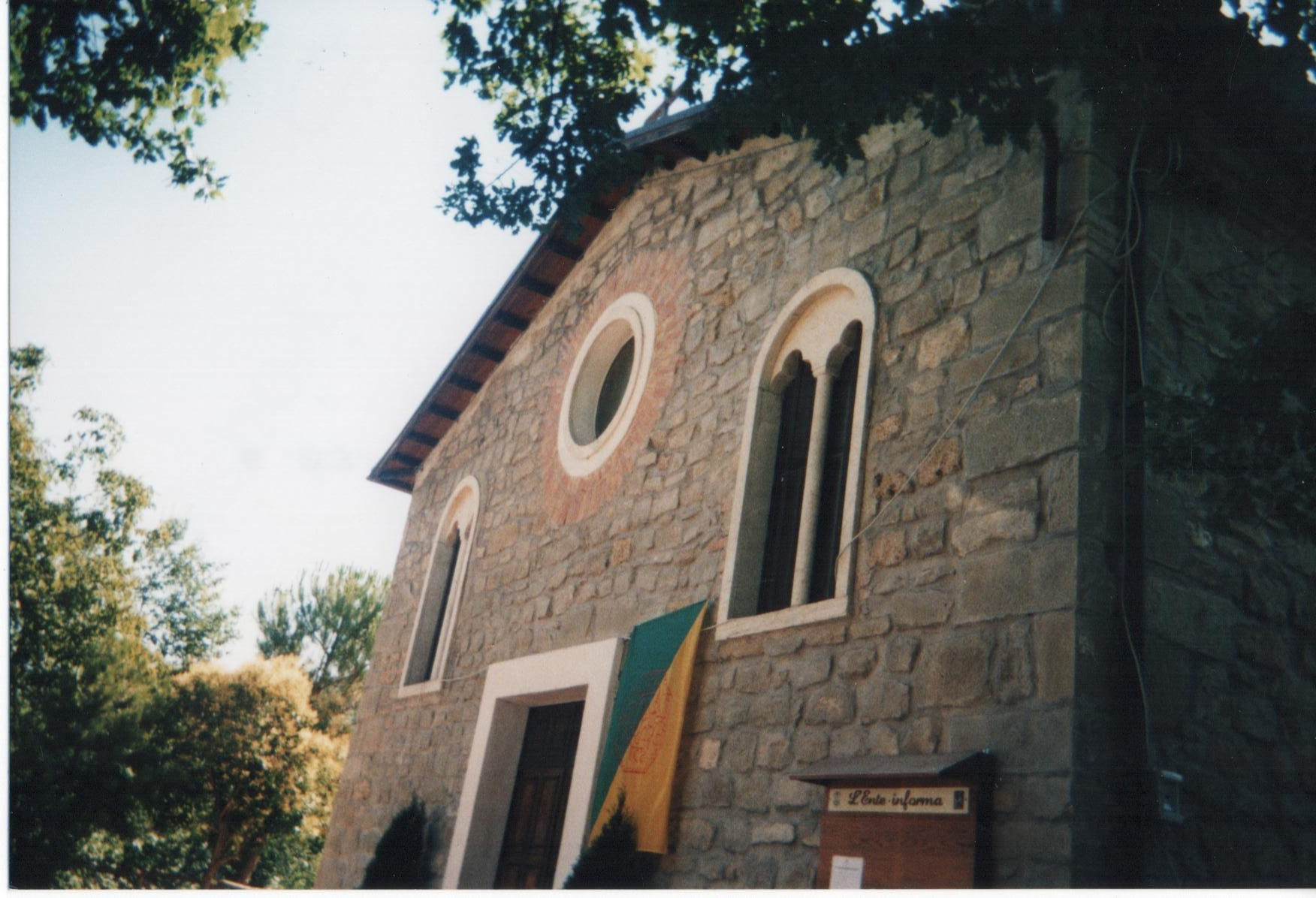
Church of Saints Proto and Hyacinth

The village has preserved its charm intact: in addition to the entire urban fabric, characterized by picturesque alleyways and dignified small palaces, the Church of Saints Proto and Hyacinth is of interest, featuring valuable wooden statues. Moreover, several buildings retain finely crafted grey sandstone portal jambs bearing the inscription "casa franca", testifying to the privilege of tax exemption, or the inscription "R. di Senarica" with the coat of arms depicting a lion rampant holding a horseshoe in its claws. The best-known example of the latter inscription is found on the house dating from 1565, at no. 12 Via Piave, whose architrave still preserves four symbols.

== Society ==
=== Languages and dialects ===
In the local phraseology, distinctive similarities with the Venetian language can still be found. For example, the word fondaco, meaning a warehouse for goods, food or tools; or arca, meaning a chest; or scurppelle, that is scrippelle (a typical local dish).

=== Traditions and folklore ===
The local tradition of the "republic", of relatively recent origin (18th century), is based on medieval terminology in which the term res publica referred to the feudal demesne over which local lords exercised the right of bannum, namely their prerogatives deriving from the act of enfeoffment, traceable at least from the 15th century.

Existing documents do not attest to the presence of any republican institution in the modern sense, which would presuppose independence from other authorities beyond the citizens of this small locality in Abruzzo, in the Province of Teramo. Viceroyal diplomas from the late 16th and early 17th centuries, cited in several texts, cast doubt—if not logical and documentary exclusion—on the “republican” hypothesis claimed by Senarica. The official website of the municipality of Crognaleto, of which Senarica is a hamlet, explicitly states that there is no certain documentary evidence supporting the legend.

The inhabitants are said to have borne the title of barons, allegedly granted by the Venice to its “Serene sister” on the occasion of a supposed alliance whereby Senarica sent two soldiers and twenty ducats annually to secure Venetian protection. To commemorate this event, the village organizes the Festa della Repubblica on 13 August; in 2013 a representative of the Municipality of Venice participated in another local event to recall the historic connection between the two places.

=== Films ===
- Tucci in Italy, Season 1, Episode 4 (2025)

== See also ==
- Alvi, Crognaleto
- Crognaleto
- Poggio Umbricchio
- Republic of Senarica
- Republic of Cospaia
- Vomano Valley
- List of historic states of Italy
- European microstates
- List of republics
