= Alto Velo Claim =

Territorial dispute in the Caribbean

The Alto Velo Claim, also referred to as the Alta Vela Affair, was a territorial claim against the Dominican government by American adventurers ejected from Alto Velo Island by Dominican officials in October 1860. In all, three companies claimed U.S. protection of their right to mine guano from the island under the Guano Islands Act of 1856, but the U.S. Department of State never recognized U.S. interests in the island.

== Claim dispute ==
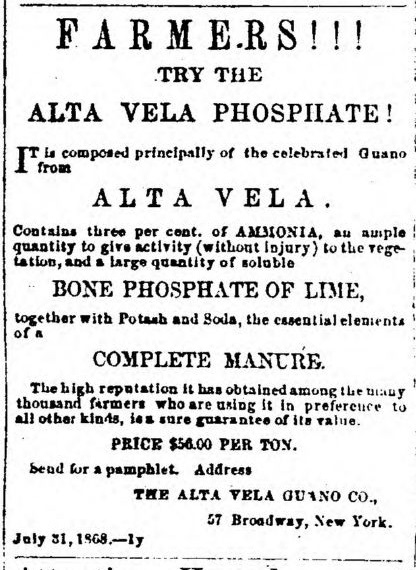
An 1868 newspaper advertisement for Alta Vela phosphate fertilizer

The initial claim on the island, located some 15 nautical miles (28 km) south of Hispaniola, was established on March 19, 1860, by Captain R. Daubley of the brig Delta, who landed on the island, loaded the ship with guano, and departed after noting some 15,000 short tons (14,000 t) of guano deposits. A chemical analysis of the guano retrieved found it to consist of 29.16 percent phosphoric acid and 70.84 percent bone phosphate of lime.

Under the Guano Islands Act of 1856, W.T. Kendall filed a claim on the island with the U.S. Department of State in mid-May 1860. Around the same time, a second claim on the island was filed by the Baltimore-based firm Patterson & Murguiondo, based on a visit to the island by Captain S.R. Kimball of the schooner Boston on February 23, 1860. The State Department advised that the island, based on its name, may have been previously discovered by Spain, and thus under the control of the Dominican Republic.

Representatives of Patterson & Murguiondo claimed to work the guano deposits from March 1860 to October 24, 1860, at which time the Dominican warship Mercedes arrived at the island under the command of Francisco Nio. The Dominicans landed with an artillery corps led by General Juan Evertsz to assert Dominican control over the island, ordering the foreigners to depart within 24 hours. Without a ship to remove them, 12 workers were taken prisoner and brought to the capital, Santo Domingo. The Dominicans also demolished the company's buildings on the island proper. An American investigation of the incident determined that Alto Velo fell into an area then-disputed between Haiti and the Dominican Republic and that neither country had established a clear claim or record of occupation.

Due to the U.S. Civil War and the unsuccessful Spanish reoccupation of the Dominican Republic occurring simultaneously, work on the Alto Velo Claims was suspended from 1861 to 1865, resuming after the U.S. and the Dominican Republic established formal political relations in 1865. In February 1866, a third claim was filed on the island by Henry Root from Thomas R. Webster & Co. of New York.

In 1867, following an examination of the competing claims, a survey of the region, and review of historical mentions of the island on maps and records since 1494, the State Department again advised that Alto Velo was a Dominican island and declined to support any of the Guano Islands Act claims.

== Final resolution ==
Throughout the claims process, former U.S. Attorney General Jeremiah S. Black was the lawyer representing Patterson & Murguiondo. In 1867, a final statement from Secretary of State William H. Seward advised against the use of U.S. military force to enforce the claims on Alto Velo. In the statement, Seward cited an 1859 opinion by Black disallowing a Guano Islands Act claim on Cayo Verde (Green Cay) in the Bahamas.

In a final effort to have his client's claim enforced, Black asked President Andrew Johnson to order Seward to approve the claim. At the time, Black was a defending counsel in Johnson's impeachment trial and when Johnson refused, Black resigned from the defense team. Whether the resignation was due to Johnson's refusal to support the Alto Velo claim or his unpopularity among Congressional reformers (and thus a liability to the defense team), however, is disputed.

After Seward declined to enforce any of the prior claims on Alto Velo, Root and his partners formed the Alta Vela Guano Company to mine guano under a concession from the Dominican Republic. In March 1871, the company sought U.S. support of its claim on the island when the Dominican government evicted it in favor of a British concessionaire. Again, the U.S. declined to intervene, deeming the island under Dominican control. Subsequently, in June 1873, the State Department affirmed to Haitian authorities that the United States considered Alto Velo part of the Dominican Republic.

A 1932 U.S. Department of State report on the status of Guano Island Act claims included Alto Velo among the islands "to which the United States has no claim".

== See also ==
- List of Guano Island claims
