= Alvi, Crognaleto =

Coordinates: 42°33′29″N 13°27′08″E

Alvi
- frazione
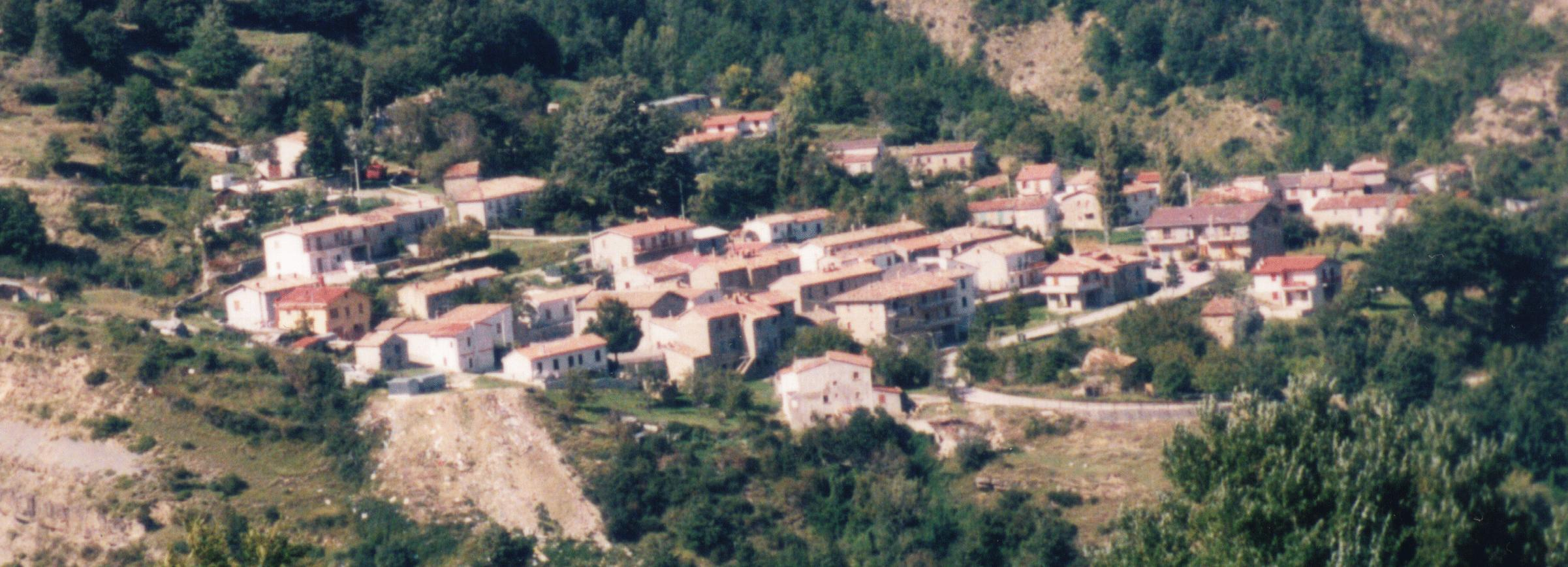
- Alvi
- Interactive map of Alvi
- Country: Italy
- Region: Abruzzo
- Province: Teramo
- Commune: Crognaleto

Population (2009)
  - Total: 27
- Time zone: UTC+1 (CET)
  - Summer (DST): UTC+2 (CEST)
- Postal code: 64043

Alvi is a frazione in the comune of Crognaleto, the Province of Teramo, and the Abruzzo region of Italy. The local parish church was built in the 14th century, and completed in 1516, with an ancient diptych of The Annunciation.

== See also ==
- Tourism in Abruzzo
