= Alto Velo Island =

Island in Dominican Republic

Native name: Isla Alto Velo
- Location within the Dominican Republic

Geography
- Coordinates: 17°28′41.5″N 71°38′04.9″W
- Area: 1 km^{2} (0.39 sq mi)

Administration
- Dominican Republic
- Province: Pedernales Province

Demographics
- Population: 0
- Pop. density: 0/km^{2} (0/sq mi)
- Isla Alto Velo Lighthouse
- Constructed: 1915
- Construction: concrete (tower)
- Height: 20 m (66 ft)
- Shape: quadrangular tower with balcony and lantern
- Markings: White (tower)
- Operator: Jaragua National Park
- Deactivated: 1980s
- Focal height: 163 m (535 ft)
- Range: 13 nmi (24 km; 15 mi)
- Characteristic: Fl(2) W 10s

Alto Velo Island (Spanish: Isla Alto Velo; also called Alta Vela Island) is a small uninhabited island south of the island of Hispaniola in the Caribbean Sea. Its maximum height is about 152 metres (499 ft) above sea level. It lies on an underwater mountain range which continues to Beata Island (about 12 km (6.5 nmi) away, separated by the Alto Velo Channel) and the southwestern coast of the Dominican Republic. It has an area of 1.02 km^{2} (0.39 mi^{2}) and is 1.4 km (0.87 mi) long, being oval in shape.

== Location ==
It is located about 220 km (120 nmi) southwest of Santo Domingo, and 74 km (40 nmi) south of Pedernales, making it the southernmost point of the Dominican Republic, a distinction sometimes claimed by Beata Island.

== Government ==
The island is part of the province of Pedernales in the Dominican Republic.

== Conservation ==
Alto Velo and Beata Islands belong to the Jaragua National Park, the largest protected area in the Caribbean region.

== History ==
The island was visited by Christopher Columbus on his second voyage in 1494; his crew caught and killed seabirds and ate Caribbean monk seals on the island, which he named Spanish: Alta Vela, lit. 'tall sail' because from a distance it looked like a tall ship at sail.

In 1863, the Confederate commerce raider CSS Alabama captured and burned at sea the Boston-based schooner Chatelaine off the coast of Alto Velo Island.

In the 1860s, at least three U.S.-based companies claimed the island under the Guano Islands Act; however, the U.S. Department of State determined that the island, despite lying in an area then-disputed between Haiti and the Dominican Republic, likely belonged to the Dominican Republic (due to historical Spanish claims, geography, and other factors) and therefore could not be claimed under the act. A 1932 U.S. Department of State report on the status of Guano Island Act claims included Alto Velo among the islands "to which the United States has no claim."

Dominican officials authorized foreign concessionaires to mine guano from the island until the early 20th century, when synthetic fertilizers became common. A 1950 botanical expedition to Alto Velo noted that "the scars of the mining operations on the leeward slopes of the island" remained visible and that "artifacts of mining still litter portions of the hill."

== See also ==
- List of lighthouses in the Dominican Republic
- Alto Velo Claim
- List of Guano Island claims
