= Crognaleto =

- Comune
- Comune di Crognaleto
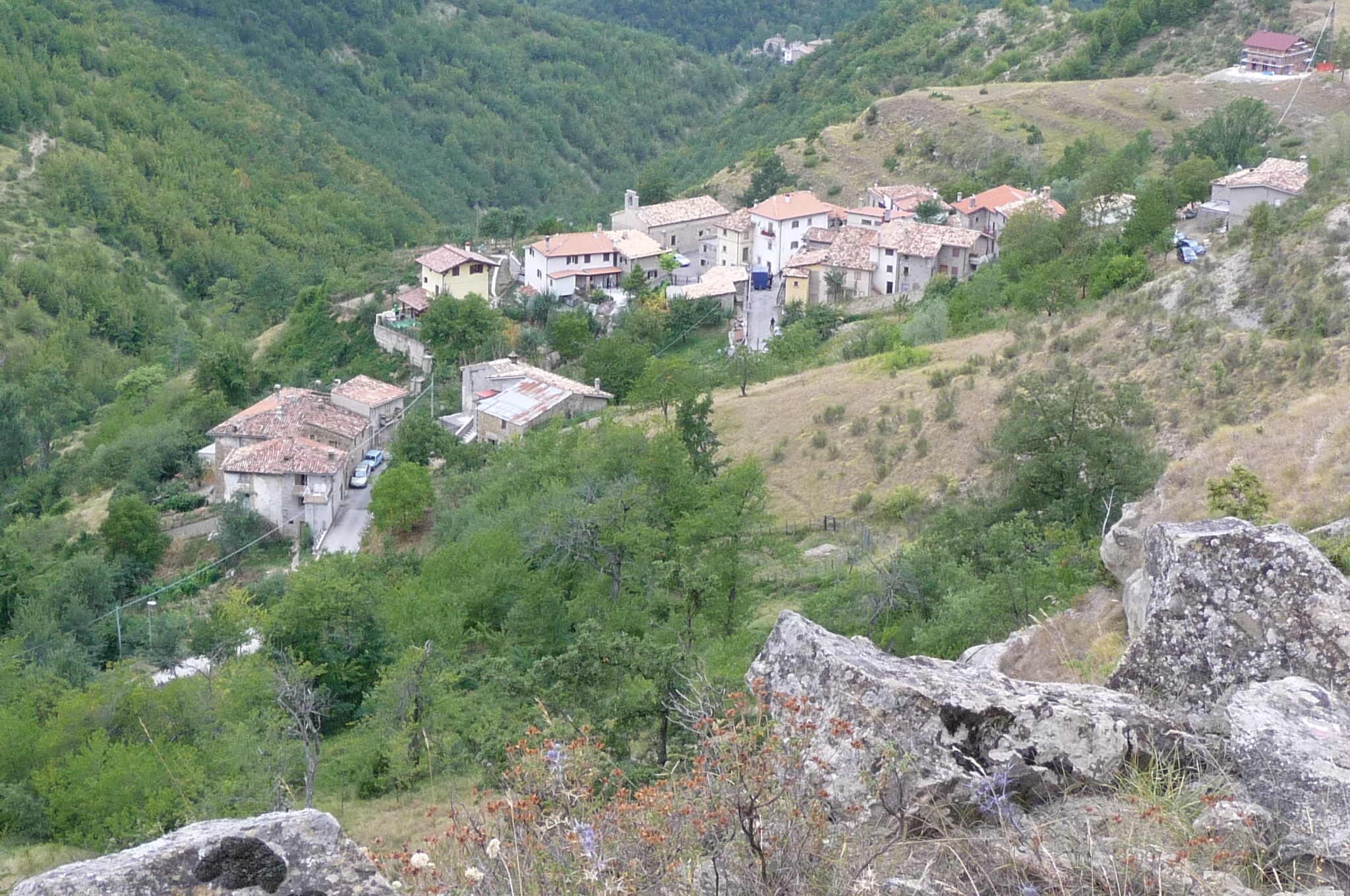

- Coat of arms

- Location within Italy Location within Abruzzo
- Coordinates: 42°35′N 13°29′E
- Country: Italy
- Region: Abruzzo
- Province: Teramo (TE)
- Frazioni: Aiello, Alvi, Aprati, Cervaro, Cesacastina, Figliola, Frattoli, Macchia Vomano, Nerito, Piano Vomano, Poggio Umbricchio, San Giorgio, Santa Croce, Senarica, Tottea, Valle Vaccaro

Government
  - Mayor: Giuseppe D'Alonzo

Area
  - Total: 123 km^{2} (47 sq mi)
- Elevation: 835 m (2,740 ft)

Population (1 January 2009)
  - Total: 1,525
  - Density: 12.4/km^{2} (32.1/sq mi)
- Demonym: Crognaletani
- Time zone: UTC+1 (CET)
  - Summer (DST): UTC+2 (CEST)
- Postal code: 64043
- Dialing code: 0861
- Website: Official website

Crognaleto is a comune and city of slightly less than 2,000 people in the Province of Teramo, central Italy. Crognaleto sits at an elevation of 1,105 metres (3,625 ft) and has its communal administrative offices in the frazione (outlying area) of Nerito. The commune of Crognaleto sits on the slopes of the Monti della Laga mountain range and extends across both the northern and the southern slopes of the Vomano Valley. It lies within the Gran Sasso e Monti della Laga National Park.

== Sources ==
- Giulio Di Nicola, Crognaleto, in La Gazzetta di Teramo, 7 settembre 1975, p. 1. (in Italian)
- Tottea, visioni d'epoca, Pro Loco di Tottea, Ricerche & Redazioni, Teramo, 2006. (in Italian)
