= List of historical states of Italy =

Italy, up until its unification in 1861, was a conglomeration of city-states, republics, and other political entities. The following is a list of the various Italian states during that period. Following the fall of the Western Roman Empire and the arrival of the Middle Ages (in particular from the 11th century), the Italian Peninsula was divided into numerous states. Many of these states consolidated into major political units that balanced the power on the Italian Peninsula: the Papal States, the Venetian Republic, the Republic of Florence, the Duchy of Milan, the Kingdom of Naples and the Kingdom of Sicily. Unlike all the other Italian states of the medieval and early modern period, the republics of Venice and Genoa, thanks to their maritime power, went beyond territorial conquests within the Italian Peninsula, conquering various regions across the Mediterranean and Black Seas.

== Ancient Italy ==
Ethnolinguistic map of Italy in the Iron Age, before the Roman expansion in Italy

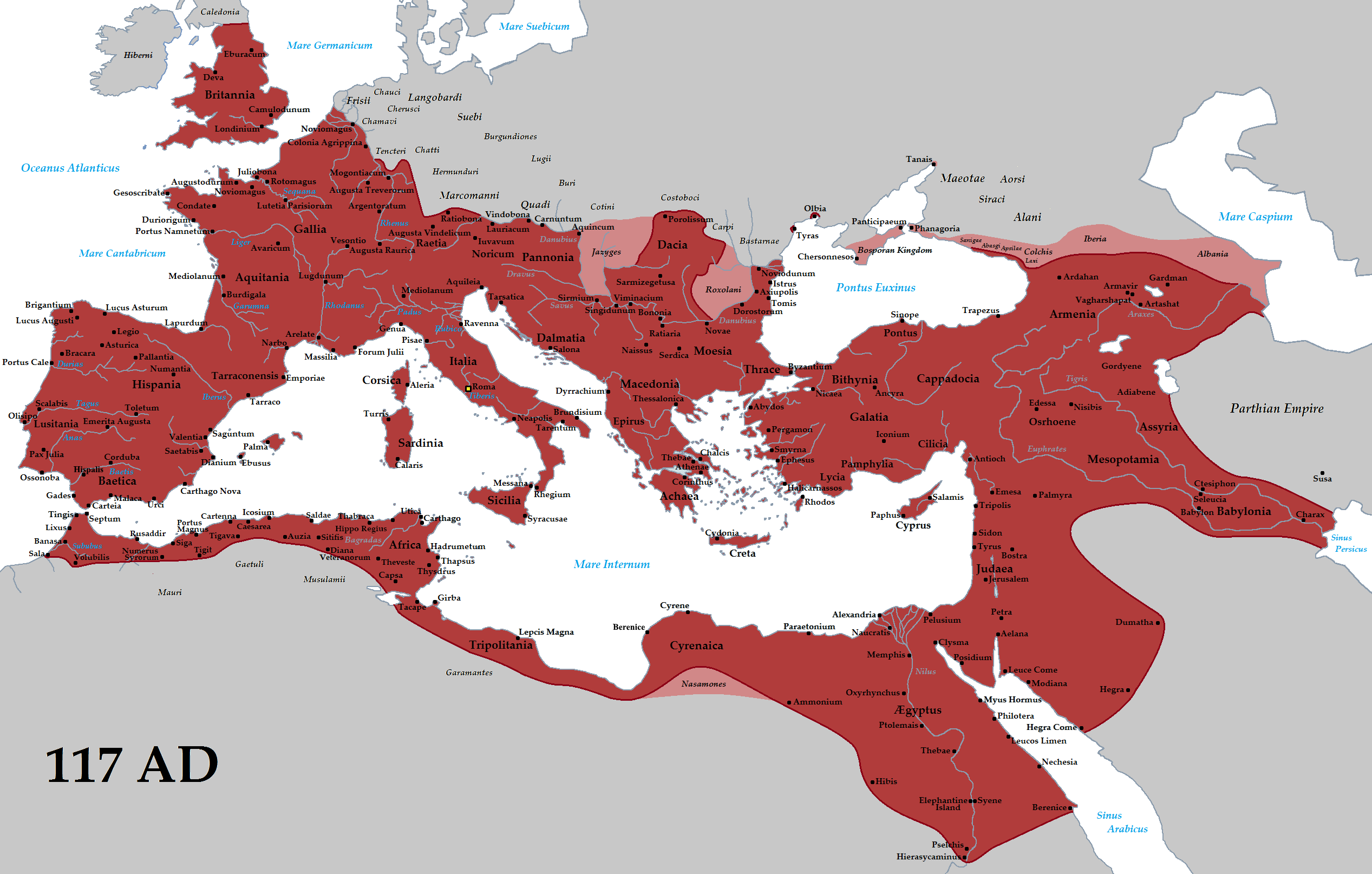
The Roman Empire at its greatest extent, 117 AD

The ancient peoples of Italy are broadly referred to in historiography as Italic peoples, although in modern linguistics this term is used to define only the speakers of the Italic languages, namely the Latino-Faliscans and the Osco-Umbrians. They include:

- Etruscans
- Italic peoples in the strict sense:
  - Latino-Faliscans:
    - Latins
      - Romans
        - Roman Kingdom
        - Roman Republic
        - Roman Empire
        - Western Roman Empire
    - Falisci
  - Osco-Umbrians, also called Sabellians:
    - Umbrians
      - Marsi
      - Umbri
      - Volsci
    - Oscans
      - Marrucini
      - Osci
        - Aurunci
        - Ausones
        - Campanians
      - Paeligni
      - Sabines
    - Samnitics
      - Bruttii
      - Frentani
      - Lucani
      - Samnites
        - Pentri
        - Caraceni
        - Caudini
        - Hirpini
    - Others:
      - Aequi
      - Fidenates
      - Hernici
      - Picentes
      - Vestini
      - Sicels
      - Venetics
- Ligures
- Sardinians
- Greek colonies in Magna Graecia
- Phoenician settlements in insular Italy
- Carthaginian settlements in insular Italy
- Cisalpine Gauls

== Early Middle Ages ==
- Kingdom of Italy
- Ostrogothic Kingdom
- Lombard Kingdom
- Duchy of Rome (under the Byzantine Empire)
- Exarchate of Ravenna (under the Byzantine Empire)
- Exarchate of Carthage (under the Byzantine Empire)
- Thema of Sicily (under the Byzantine Empire)
- Catepanate of Italy (under the Byzantine Empire)
- Duchy of Benevento
- Duchy of Spoleto
- Duchy of Naples
- Papal States
- Republic of Venice

== High Middle Ages ==
Political map of Italy in the year 1000

Political map of Southern Italy in the year 1112

=== States in Central and Northern Italy ===
- Papal States
- Republic of Venice
- Republic of Genoa
- Republic of Pisa
- Republic of Florence
- Republic of Lucca
- Republic of Siena
- Republic of Ancona
- Republic of Noli
- Republic of Ragusa
- Republic of San Marino

=== States in Southern Italy ===
- Principality of Benevento
- Principality of Salerno
- Catepanate of Italy (under the Byzantine Empire)
- Principality of Capua
- Duchy of Gaeta
- Duchy of Naples
- Duchy of Amalfi
- Duchy of Sorrento
- Emirate of Sicily (under the Fatimid Caliphate)
- County of Sicily
- County of Apulia
- Duchy of Apulia
- Duchy of Calabria
- Duchy of Apulia and Calabria
- Kingdom of Sicily

=== States of the Holy Roman Empire ===
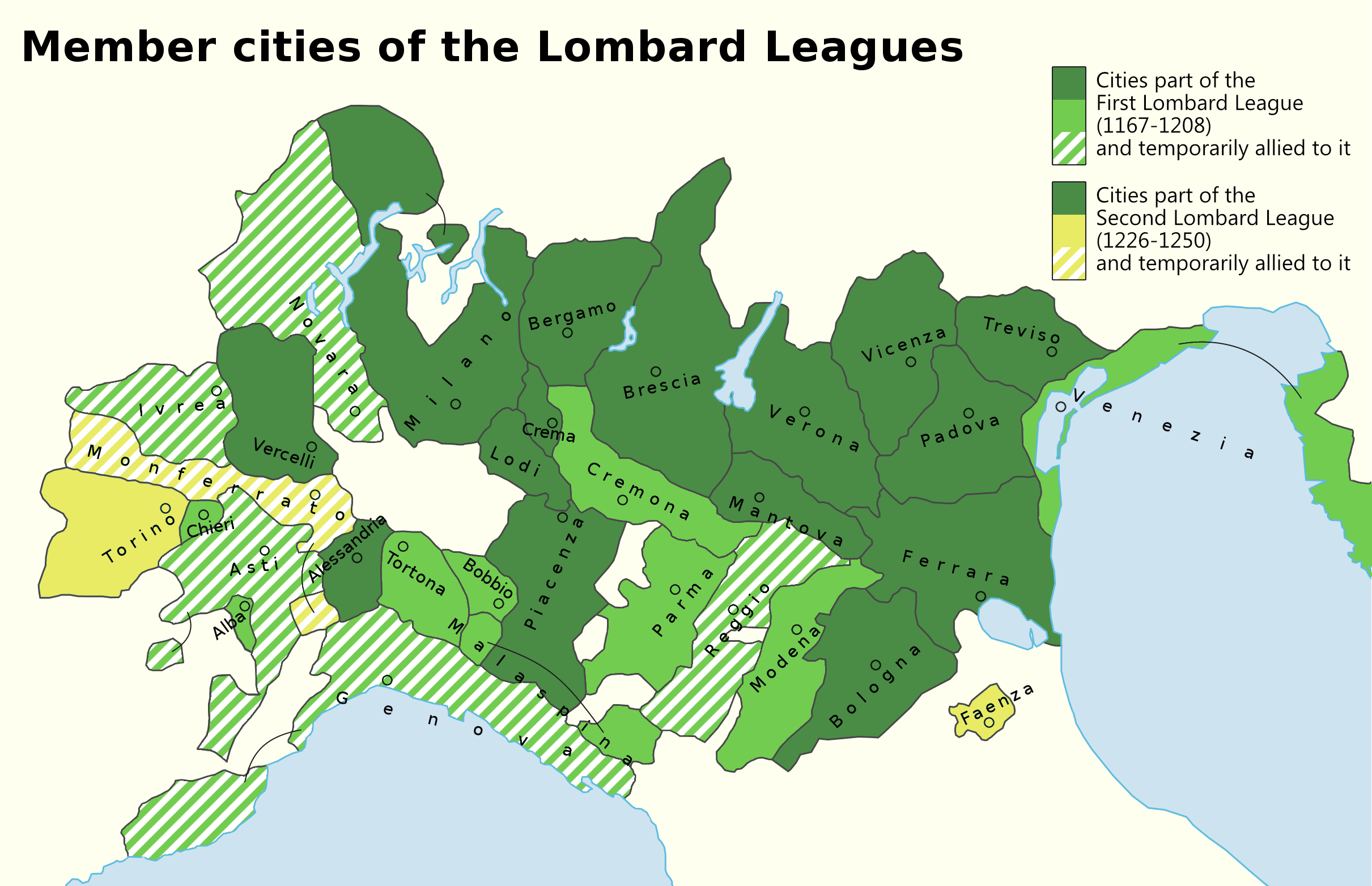
Map of city-states or communes participating in the first and second Lombard League, during the 12th and 13th centuries

- Kingdom of Italy
- March of Tuscany
- March of Verona
- March of Treviso
- March of Ivrea (Before turning into the Commune of Ivrea)
- March of Turin
- March of Montferrat
- March of Genoa
- Patriarchate of Aquileia (including March of Friuli and March of Istria)
- Duchy of Spoleto
- Bishopric of Brixen
- Bishopric of Trent
- Bishopric of Acqui
- Commune of Acqui
- Commune of Alba
- Commune of Alessandria
- Commune of Arezzo
- Commune of Bergamo
- Commune of Bologna
- Commune of Brescia
- Commune of Camerino
- Commune of Chieri
- Commune of Como
- Commune of Crema
- Commune of Cremona
- Commune of Faenza
- Commune of Ferrara
- Commune of Lodi
- Commune of Mantua
- Commune of Milan
- Commune of Modena
- Commune of Novara
- Commune of Orvieto
- Commune of Padau
- Commune of Pavia
- Commune of Parma
- Commune of Perugia
- Commune of Piacenza
- Commune of Reggio
- Commune of San Gimignano
- Commune of Savona
- Commune of Terdona
- Commune of Treviso
- Commune of Vercelli
- Commune of Vicenza
- Municipality of Ascoli
- County of Desana
- County of Savoy
- County of Gorizia
- Marquisate of Saluzzo
- Marquisate of Ceva
- Marquisate of Incisa
- Marquisate of Finale
- Republic of Sassari

=== Sardinian Judicates ===
- Agugliastra
- Arborea
- Cagliari
- Gallura
- Logudoro

== Late Middle Ages ==
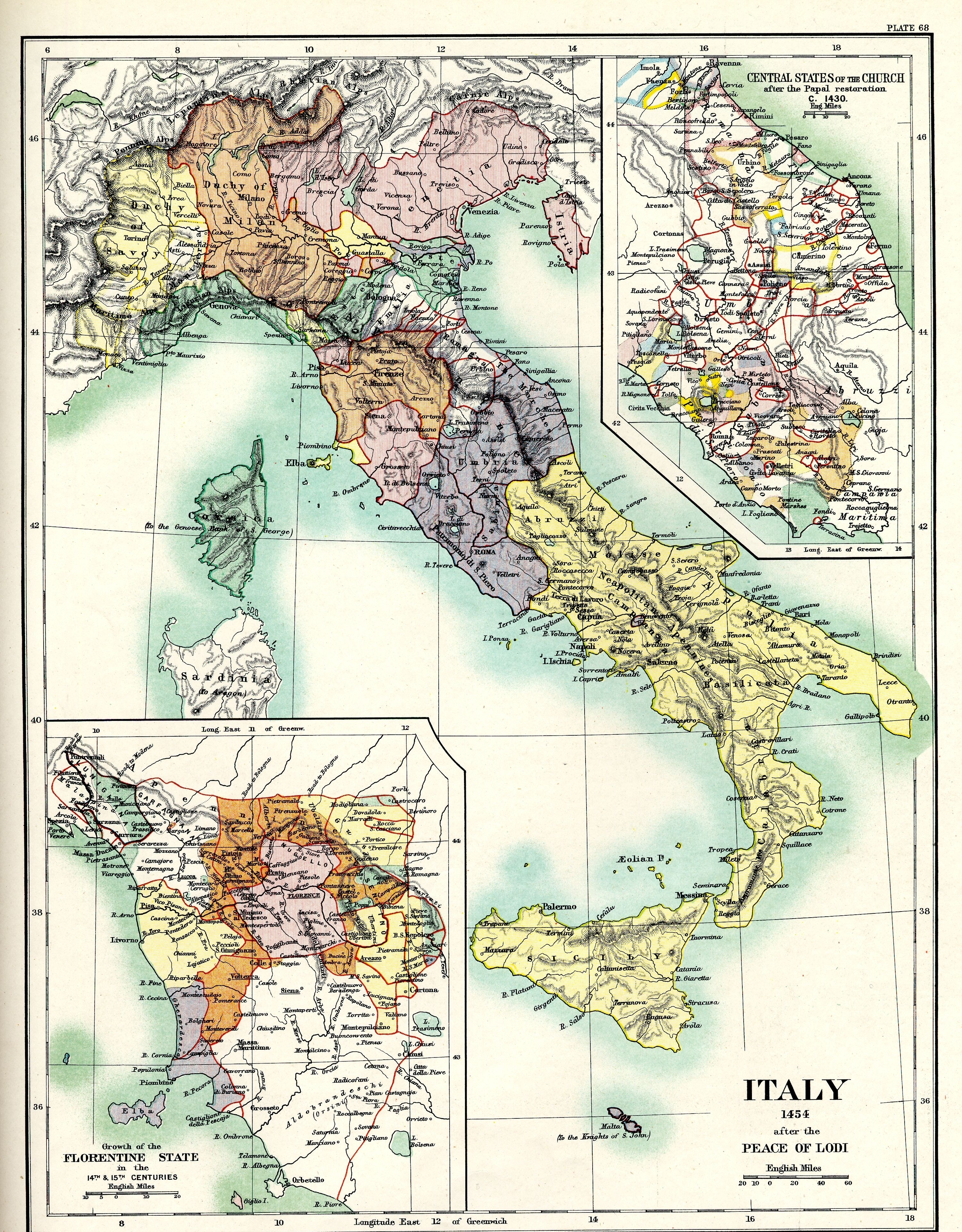
Italy in 1454, right after the Peace of Lodi

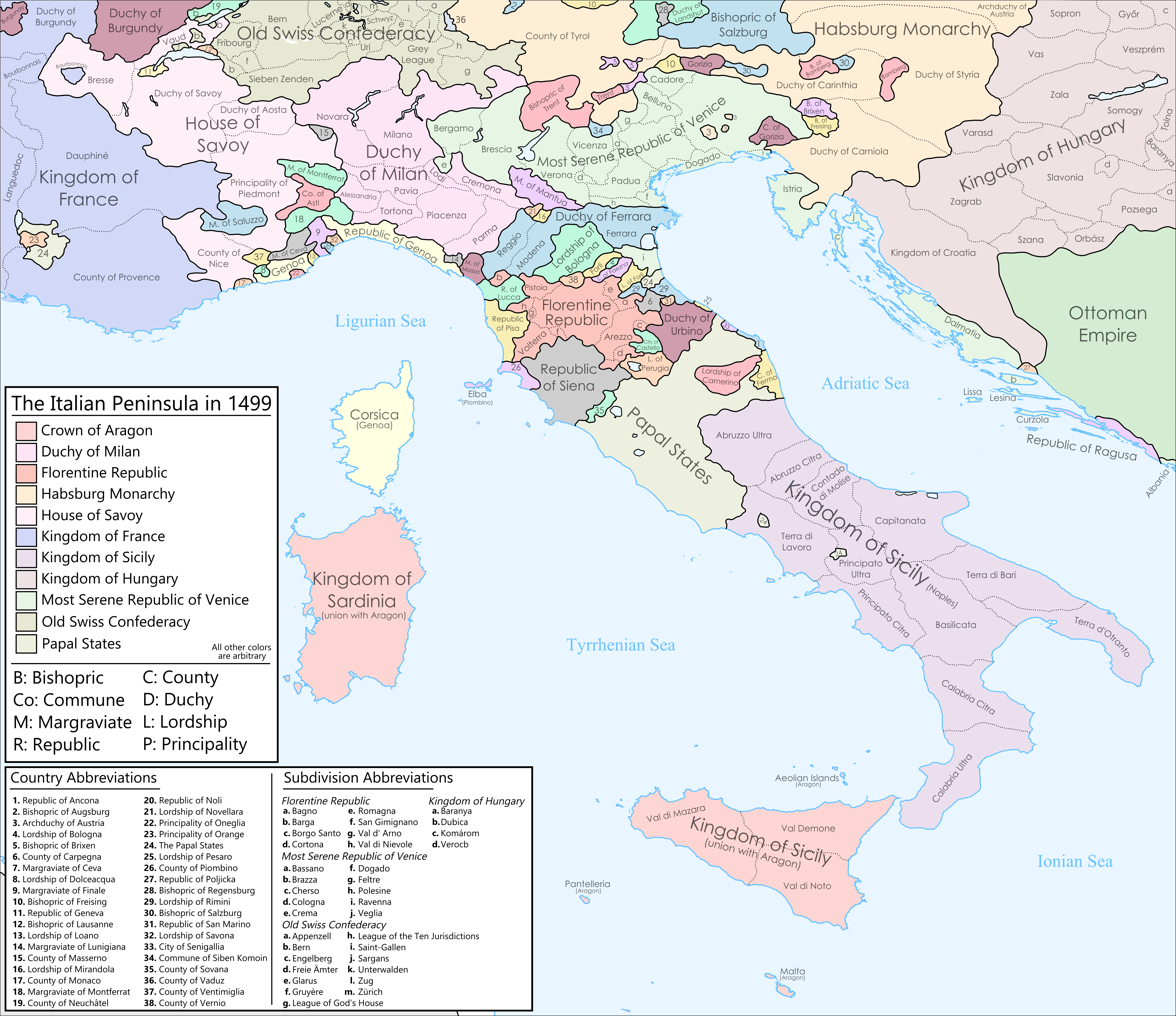
The Italian Peninsula in 1499

=== Major states ===
- Papal States
- Republic of Venice
- Republic of Florence
- Kingdom of Naples
- Duchy of Milan
- Republic of Genoa

=== Minor states ===
- Kingdom of Sardinia and Corsica
- Kingdom of Sicily
- Duchy of Ferrara
- Lordship of Bologna
- Lordship of Faenza
- Lordship of Milan (before being raised to Duchy in 1395)
- Lordship of Padua
- Lordship of Perugia
- Duchy of Modena and Reggio
- Prince-Bishopric of Brixen
- Prince-Bishopric of Trent
- Principality of Compiano
- Marquisate of Bastia
- Marquisate of Ceva
- Marquisate of Finale
- Marquisate of Fosdinovo
- Marquisate of Incisa
- Marquisate of Mantua
- Marquisate of Massa
- Marquisate of Saluzzo
- Marquisate of Montferrat
- County of Asti
- County of Cocconato
- County of Correggio
- County of Desana
- County of Gorizia
- County of Guastalla
- County of Masserano
- County of Mirandola
- County of Montechiarugolo
- County of Novellara
- County of Pitigliano
- County of Santa Fiora
- County of Savoy (raised to Duchy of Savoy in 1416)
  - County of Nice (in personal union with Savoy)
- County of Scandiano
- County of Sovana
- County of Tende
- County of Urbino (raised to Duchy of Urbino in 1443)
- County of Correggio
- Commune of Savona
- Golden Ambrosian Republic
- Republic of Ancona
- Republic of Cospaia
- Republic of Lucca
- Republic of Noli
- Republic of Ragusa
- Republic of San Marino
- Republic of Senarica
- Republic of Siena
- Rebel city-states in Papal States

== After the Italian Wars ==
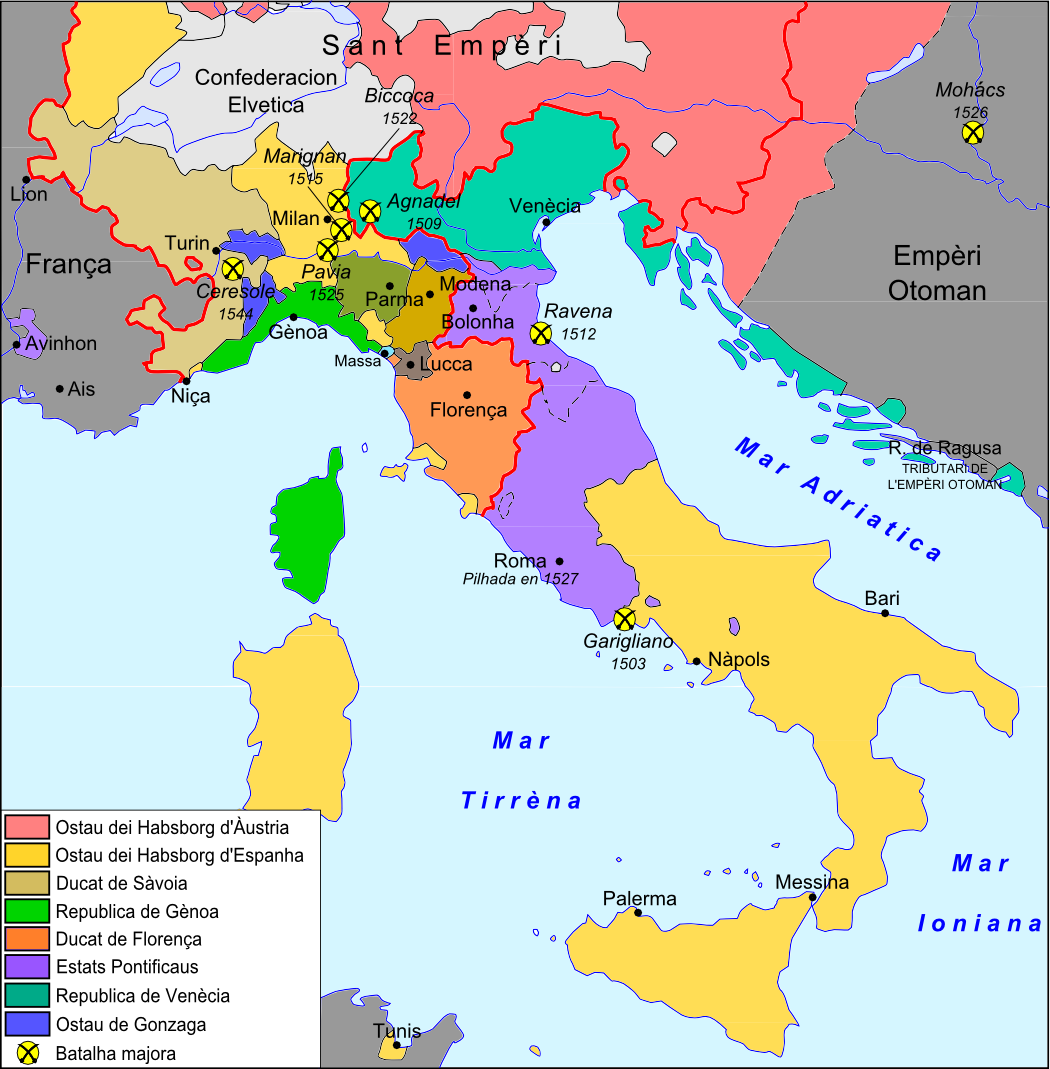
Map of Italy in 1559 after the Treaties of Cateau-Cambrésis. Possessions and Viceroyalties of the Spanish Habsburgs in yellow. Imperial fiefs in Italy of the Austrian Habsburgs in red borders.

The Peace of Cateau Cambrésis ended the Italian Wars in 1559. The kingdoms of Sicily, Sardinia, Naples (inclusive of the State of Presidi) and the Duchy of Milan were left under the control of Spanish Habsburgs. France was in control of several fortresses and in particular of the Marquisate of Saluzzo. All the other Italian states remained independent, with the most powerful being the Venetian Republic, the Medici's Duchy of Tuscany, the Savoyard state, the Republic of Genoa, and the Papal States. The Gonzaga in Mantua, the Este in Modena and Ferrara and the Farnese in Parma and Piacenza continued to be important dynasties. Parts of the north of Italy remained a part of the Holy Roman Empire.

=== Major states ===
- Papal States
- Republic of Venice
- Grand Duchy of Tuscany
- Kingdom of Naples
- Republic of Genoa
- Duchy of Savoy
- Duchy of Milan

=== Minor states ===
- Kingdom of Sardinia (under Spanish rule)
- Kingdom of Sicily
- Prince-Bishopric of Brixen
- Prince-Bishopric of Trent
- Principality of Compiano
- Principality of Piombino
- Principality of Monaco
- Principality of Bozollo
- Duchy of Mantua
- Duchy of Ferrara
  - Duchy of Modena and Reggio (In personal union with Ferrara)
- Duchy of Parma and Piacenza
  - Duchy of Castro (in personal union with Parma)
- Duchy of Urbino
- Marquisate of Arquata
- Marquisate of Bastia
- Marquisate of Castiglione (raised to Principality of Castiglione in 1609)
- Marquisate of Finale
- Marquisate of Fosdinovo
- Marquisate of Massa (raised to Principality of Massa in 1568)
  - Marquisate of Carrara (in personal union with Massa)
- Marquisate of Masserano (raised to Principality of Masserano in 1598)
- Marquisate of Montferrat (raised to Duchy of Montferrat in 1574; in personal union with Mantua)
- Marquisate of Sabbioneta (raised to Duchy of Sabbioneta in 1577)
- Marquisate of Torriglia
- County of Correggio (raised to Principality of Correggio in 1616)
- County of Guastalla
- County of Pitigliano
- County of Mirandola
- County of Montechiarugolo
- County of Novellara and Bagnolo
- County of Santa Fiora
- County of Tende
- County of Correggio (raised to Duchy of Coreggio in 1630)
- Monastic State of the Order of Malta
- Republic of Ancona
- Republic of Cospaia
- Republic of Lucca
- Republic of Noli
- Republic of Ragusa
- Republic of San Marino

== After the Wars of Succession of the 18th century ==
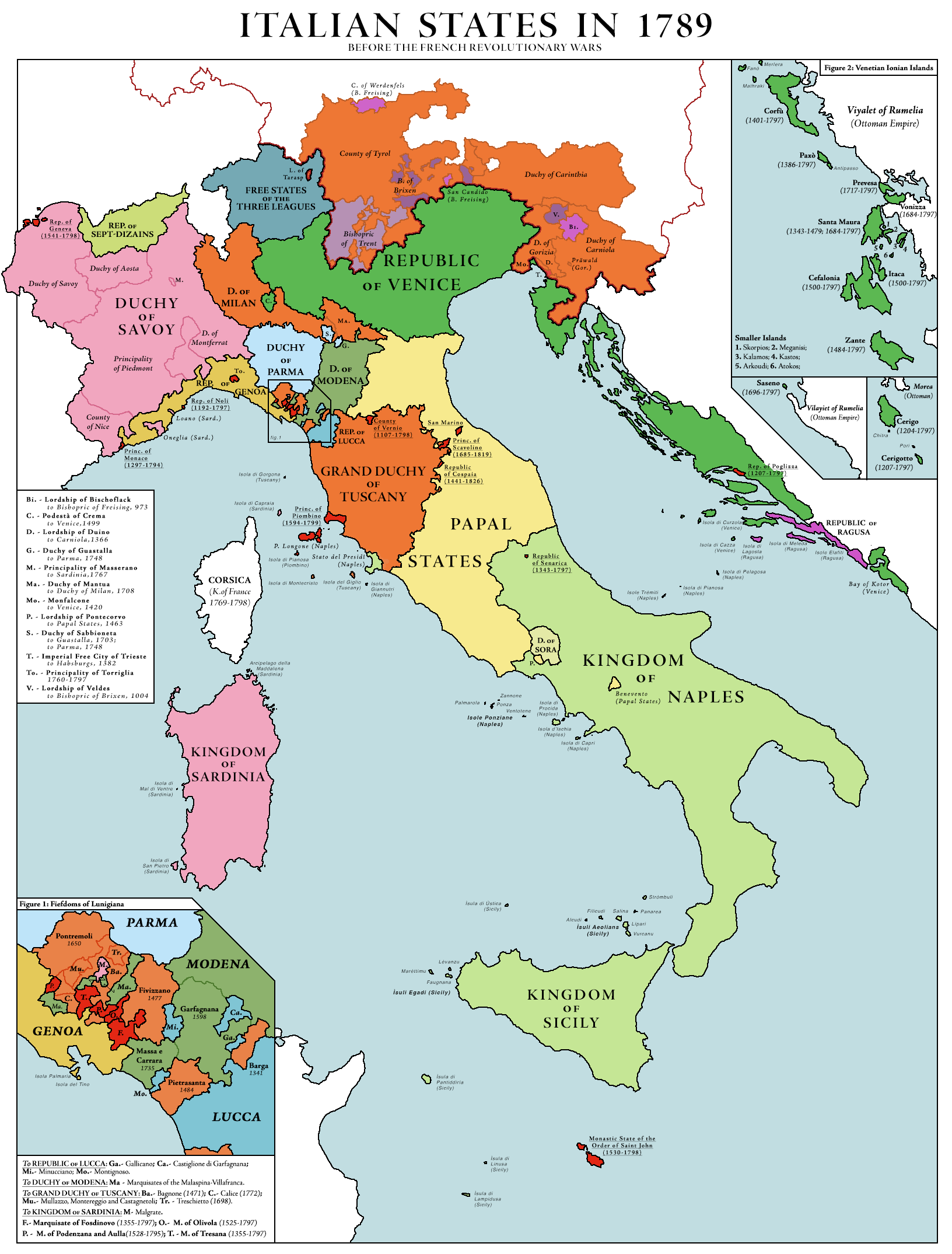
Political map of Italy in the year 1789

During the War of the Spanish Succession (1701-1714), Savoy acquired Sicily, while the remaining Spanish dominions in Italy (Naples, Sardinia, and Milan) were taken over by the Austrian Habsburgs. In 1720, Savoy exchanged Sicily for Sardinia. Following the extinction of the House of Medici, the Grand Duchy of Tuscany was ruled by the Habsburg-Lorraine. Later on, Southern Italy passed to a cadet branch of the House of Bourbon, known as House of Bourbon-Two Sicilies. Other states such as Genoa, Venice, Modena, the Papal States and Lucca remained with their governments unchanged.

=== Major states ===
- Papal States
- Kingdom of Naples (under the Habsburg monarchy from 1714 to 1735; in personal union with Sicily under the Bourbon-Two Sicilies thereafter)
- Grand Duchy of Tuscany (under Habsburg-Lorraine after 1737)
- Duchy of Milan (under Habsburg Monarchy)
- Duchy of Savoy
- Republic of Genoa
- Republic of Venice

=== Minor states ===
- Kingdom of Sardinia (under Austrian monarchy from 1714 to 1720; in personal union with Savoy thereafter)
- Kingdom of Sicily (under Savoy from 1713 to 1720; under Austrian monarchy from 1720 to 1734; in personal union with Naples under the House of Bourbon-Two Sicilies thereafter)
- Duchy of Mantua (under House of Gonzaga until 1708, Austrian Monarchy thereafter)
- Duchy of Parma and Piacenza (under Habsburg Monarchy from 1734 to 1748, under House of Bourbon-Parma thereafter)
- Duchy of Guastalla (in personal union with Parma from 1748)
- Duchy of Modena and Reggio
  Political map of Italy in the year 1796
- Duchy of Massa and Carrara (in personal union with Modena from 1731)
- Duchy of Mirandola (in personal union with Modena from 1710)
- Prince-Bishopric of Brixen
- Prince-Bishopric of Trent
- Principality of Masserano
- Principality of Torriglia
- Principality of Piombino
- Principality of Monaco
- Duchy of Montferrat, to House of Savoy from 1708
- Marquisate of Fosdinovo
- Marquisate of Bastia
- Republic of Lucca
- Republic of San Marino
- Republic of Ragusa
- Republic of Noli
- Republic of Cospaia
- City of Fiume and its District
- Monastic State of the Order of Malta

Their populations and other vital statistics stood as follows in the late 18th century:

- Kingdom of Naples (including Sicily): 6,000,000 (400,000 in Naples), army of 60,000 to 80,000, 2 ships of the lines and some frigates
- Republic of Venice: 3,500,000 (140,000 in the city of Venice itself), standing army and navy of 30,000, 12-15 ships of at least 54 guns plus frigates and brigs
- Kingdom of Sardinia: 2,900,000 (2,400,000 on the mainland and 500,000 on the island), 12-15 fortified cities and towns (largest being Turin at 80,000), standing army of 25,000, which could be raised to 50,000 in a time of war and 100,000 with militia
- Papal States: 2,400,000 (140,000 in the city of Rome), standing army of 6,000 to 7,000
- Austrian Lombardy (Duchy of Milan, Duchy of Mantua, and minor territories): 1,100,000 (40,000 in the city of Milan itself)
- Grand Duchy of Tuscany: 1,000,000 (80,000 in Florence), standing army of 6,000, navy of 3 frigates
- Republic of Genoa: 500,000 (100,000 in the city of Genoa itself)
- Duchy of Parma: 500,000 (40,000 in the city of Parma itself), standing army of 2,500 to 3,000
- Duchy of Modena: 350,000 (20,000 in the city of Modena itself), standing army of 5,000 to 6,000
- Republic of Lucca: 100,000

Total: 18.3 million

== During Napoleonic times (1792–1815) ==
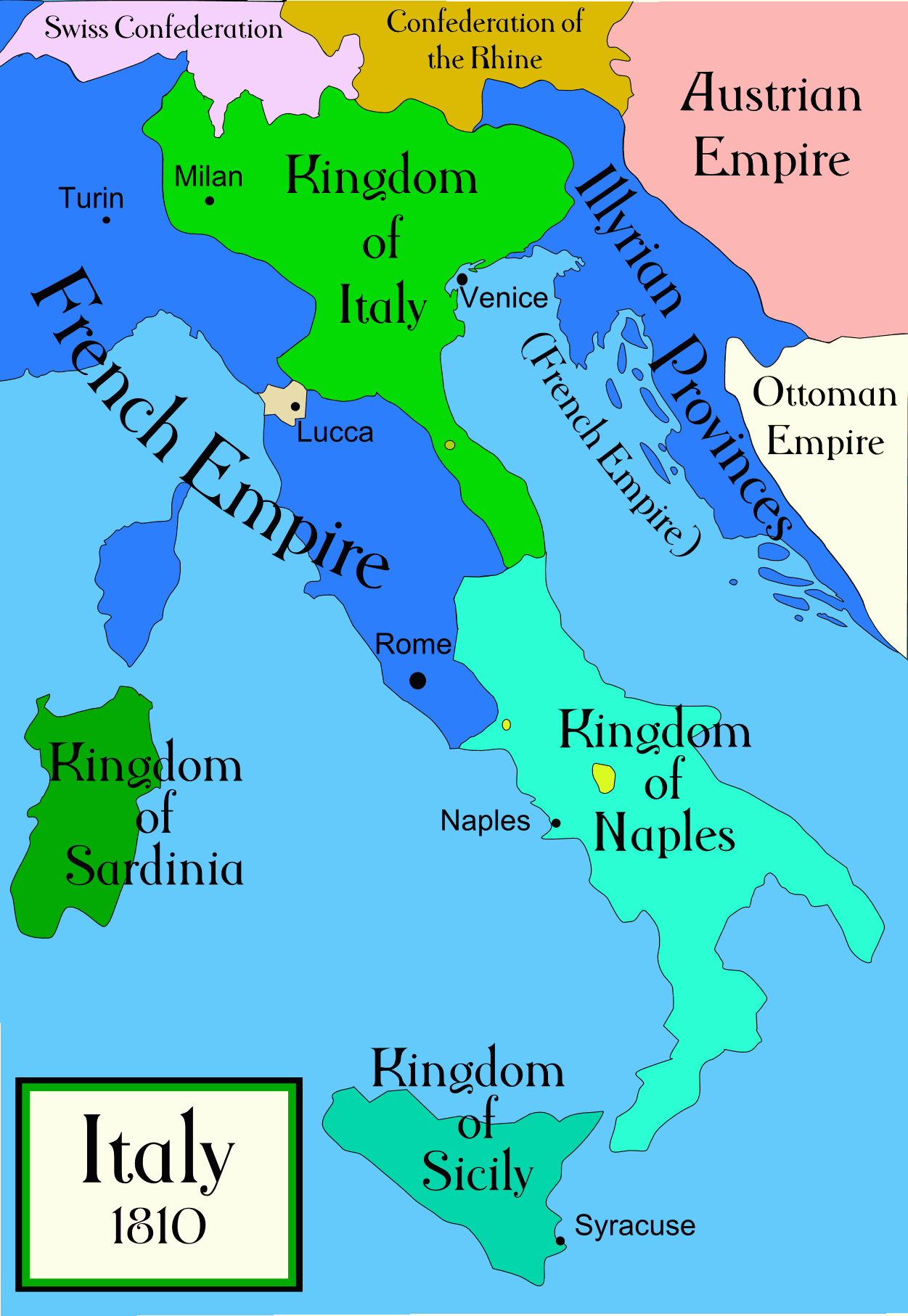
Political map of Italy in the year 1810

=== Sister republics of Revolutionary France ===
- Republic of Alba
- Anconine Republic
- Astese Republic
- Republic of Bergamo
- Bolognese Republic
- Republic of Brescia
- Cisalpine Republic
- Cispadane Republic
- Republic of Crema
- Italian Republic
- Ligurian Republic
- Jacobin State of Lucca
- Parthenopean Republic
- Republic of Pescara
- Piedmontese Republic
- Roman Republic
- Subalpine Republic
- Tiberina Republic
- Transpadane Republic

=== Client states of the First French Empire ===
- Kingdom of Etruria
- Kingdom of Italy
- Kingdom of Naples
- Principality of Lucca and Piombino
- Principality of Benevento
- Principality of Pontecorvo

=== Other states ===
- Kingdom of Sardinia
- Kingdom of Sicily
- Principality of Elba (non-hereditary Monarchy under the exiled Emperor Napoleon)
- Republic of Cospaia
- Republic of San Marino

== From the restoration to the unification ==
Political map of Italy in the year 1843

Following the defeat of Napoleon's France, the Congress of Vienna (1815) was convened to redraw the European continent. In Italy, the Congress restored the pre-Napoleonic patchwork of independent governments, either directly ruled or strongly influenced by the prevailing European powers, particularly Austria. The Congress also determined the end of two millenary republics: Genoa was annexed by the then Savoyard Kingdom of Sardinia, and Venice was incorporated with Milan into a new kingdom of the Austrian Empire.

At the time, the struggle for Italian unification was perceived to be waged primarily against the Habsburgs, since they directly controlled the predominantly Italian-speaking northeastern part of present-day Italy and were the most powerful force against the Italian unification. The Austrian Empire vigorously repressed nationalist sentiment growing in its domains on the Italian Peninsula, as well as in the other parts of Habsburg domains.

- Papal States
- Kingdom of Sardinia
- Kingdom of the Two Sicilies
- Kingdom of Lombardy–Venetia (under Austrian Empire)
- Kingdom of Illyria (under Austrian Empire)
- Grand Duchy of Tuscany
- Duchy of Parma, Piacenza and Guastalla
- Duchy of Modena and Reggio
- Duchy of Massa and Carrara
- Duchy of Lucca
- Principality of Monaco
- Republic of San Marino
- Republic of Benevento
- Republic of Pontecorvo
- Republic of Cospaia
- Republic of San Marco
- Roman Republic
- United Provinces of Central Italy

== Post-unification states ==
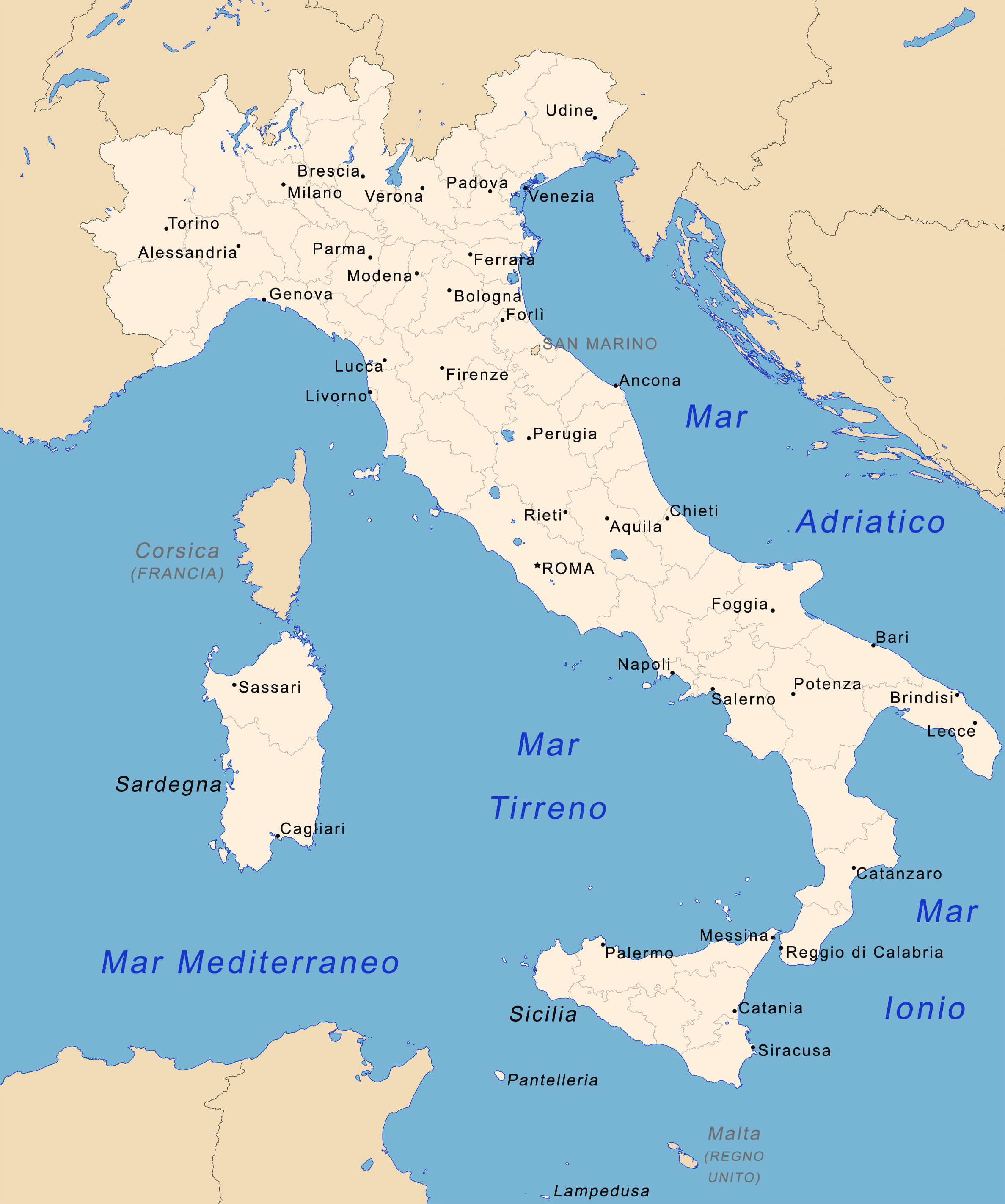
Kingdom of Italy in 1871, after the Capture of Rome

Kingdom of Italy in 1924, after World War I

- Kingdom of Italy
- Republic of San Marino

== Post-World War I microstates ==
- Italian Regency of Carnaro
- Free State of Fiume

== Post-1929 states ==
- Kingdom of Italy
- Republic of San Marino
- Vatican City State

== States during World War II ==
- Kingdom of Italy
  - Kingdom of the South
- Nazi occupied northern Italy
  - Italian Social Republic
  - Republic of San Marino (Briefly in 1944)
- Vatican City State
- The Italian Partisan Republics were the provisional state entities liberated by Italian partisans from the rule and occupation of Nazi Germany and the Italian Social Republic in 1944 during the Second World War. They were universally short-lived, with most of them being reconquered by the Wehrmacht within weeks of their formal establishments and re-incorporated into the Italian Social Republic.
  - Republic of Alba (10 October – 2 November)
  - Republic of Alto Monferrato (September – 2 December)
  - Republic of Alto Tortonese (September – December)
  - Republic of Bobbio (7 July – 27 August)
  - Republic of the Cansiglio (July – September)
  - Republic of Carnia (26 September – 10 October)
  - Republic of Carniola (2 February – March)
  - Republic of Oriental Friuli (30 June – September)
  - Republic of Pigna (IM) (18 September – 8 October)
  - Republic of the Langhe (September – November)
  - Republic of Montefiorino (17 June – 1 August)
  - Republic of Ossola (10 September – 23 October)
  - Republic of Torriglia (26 June – 27 November)
  - Republic of the Ceno Valley (10 June – 11 July)
  - Republic of the Enza Valley and the Parma Valley (June – July)
  - Republic of the Maira Valley and the Varaita Valley (June – 21 August)
  - Republic of the Taro Valley (15 June – 24 July)
  - Republic of the Lanzo Valley (25 June – September)
  - Republic of the Sesia Valley (11 June – 10 July)
  - Republic of Varzi (19/24 September – 29 November)

== Post-1946 states ==
- (Italy) Italian Republic
- Republic of San Marino
- Vatican City State
- Free Territory of Trieste (de facto dissolved 1954)

== Current states ==
- (Italy) Italian Republic
- Republic of San Marino
- Vatican City State

== See also ==
- Italian city-states
- Maritime republics
- Medieval commune
- Signoria
