= Cospaia =

Frazione in Perugia, Umbria, Italy

- Frazione
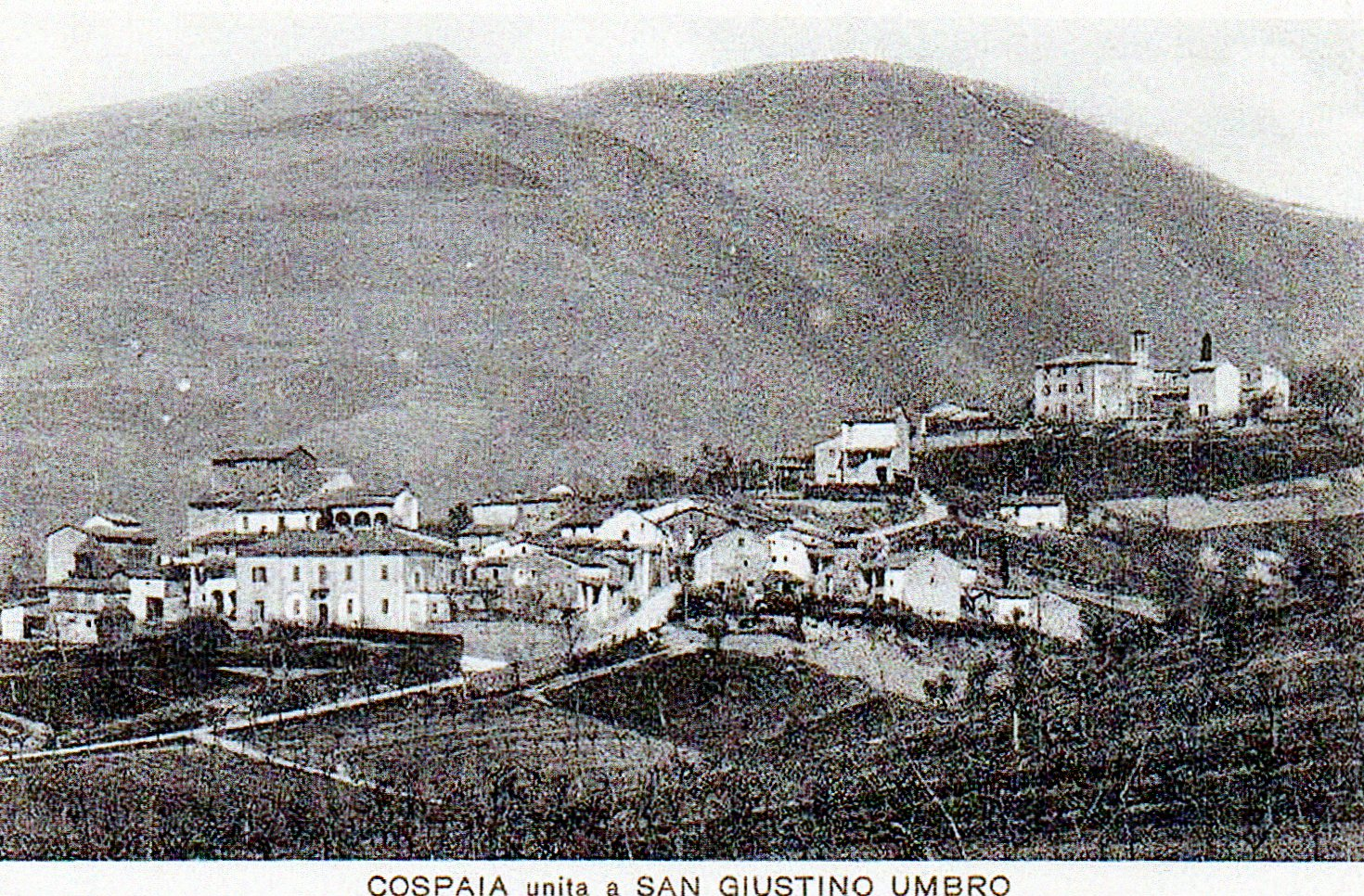
- Old view of Cospaia

- Location of Cospaia in Italy
- Coordinates: 43°33′32″N 12°10′15″E
- Country: Italy
- Region: Umbria
- Province: Perugia (PG)
- Comune: San Giustino
- Elevation: 357 m (1,171 ft)
- Time zone: UTC+1 (CET)
  - Summer (DST): UTC+2 (CEST)
- Dialing code: 075

Cospaia is an Italian hamlet (frazione) of the comune of San Giustino in the Province of Perugia, Umbria.

== History ==
The former Republic of Cospaia originated in 1441 (585 years ago) after a border demarcation error between the Papal States and the Grand Duchy of Tuscany left a narrow strip of land between the Rio della Gorgaccia and the Riascone (both tributaries of the Tiber) outside the authority of both states. The territory, about 500 metres (1,600 ft) wide and roughly 2 kilometres (1.2 mi) long, lay at the foot of Monte Gurzule and was too small to justify a territorial dispute.

Agriculture formed the basis of its economy. Toward the end of the 16th century, the first large-scale tobacco cultivations began. Within a short time, tobacco became the main economic resource for the local population. Residents cultivated and processed the crop themselves, selling it to neighboring states.

After the Napoleonic period and the Restoration, the republic was dissolved in May 1826 (200 years ago), and its territory was divided between the municipalities of San Giustino and Sansepolcro.

In the mid 19th century Cospaia functioned as a customs point due to its frontier position. In 1859, Cospaia had 322 inhabitants. Of these, 125 people resided in the village center, while 197 lived in the surrounding countryside.

The surrounding land was described in the 19th century as fertile and suitable for most crops. The shrub known as scotano grew locally and may have been connected to earlier textile activities in the area.

In the 1971 census, Cospaia was still recorded as a separate frazione, with an elevation of 376 metres (1,234 ft) and a population of 86 inhabitants. In more recent Istat classifications, it is no longer listed as an autonomous inhabited locality, as its territory is now included within the built-up area of San Giustino.

== Geography ==
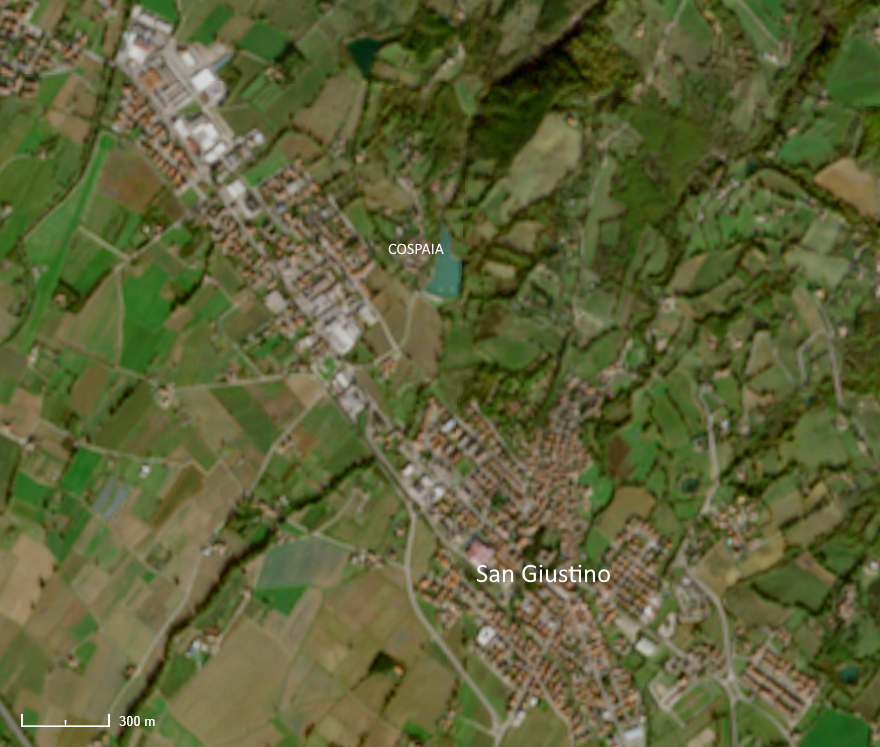
During the 20th century, the former microstate was gradually absorbed into the neighboring town of San Giustino

Cospaia is situated in the northernmost part of the province of Perugia, at the foot of the Apennines, bordering Tuscany to the west and north. It lies about 6 miles (10 km) miles north of Città di Castello and less than 1 mile (2 km) from Sansepolcro. The settlement stands in hilly terrain. A small stream flows below the village and joins the Tiber.

== Religion ==
In the mid 19th century the population was served by the parish church of San Lorenzo, which functioned as the main religious center for both the village and the rural area.

== See also ==
- Republic of Senarica
- List of historic states of Italy
