= Flag of Marche =

- Use: Civil and state flag
- Proportion: 2:3
- Adopted: 4 November 1995
- Design: A white field with the regional emblem of Marche.

The flag of Marche is one of the official symbols of the region of Marche, Italy. Like many Italian regional flags, it was adopted on 4 November 1995 for Armed Forces Day of Italy (it). In absence of a law on the subject, the regional emblem that had been adopted on 15 March 1980 was simply inserted on a white background.

== Symbolism ==
The emblem of Marche bears a stylized woodpecker, overlapping a black shape to form a capital letter M, against a green-bordered shield with a white field. The flag was designed by Maurizio Catani and Gianni Veroli.

The woodpecker was the tribal totem of the Picentes, an Italic tribe who lived in most of the territory of present-day Marche.

The bird's connection to the region is attested to in Greek and Roman literature:

Ὤρμηνται δ'εκ τῇς Σαβίνης οί Πικεντίνοι,
δρυοκολάπτου τὴν ὀδὸν ηγησαμένου τοῖς
ἀρχηγέταις, ἁφ'οὗ και τοὔνομα πικον γαρ τὸν ὄρνιν
τοῦτον ὀνομάζουσι, καὶ νομίζουσιν Ἄρηως ἱερόν.
Οικοὒσι δ'απὸ τῶν ὀρῶν ἁρξάμενοι μὲχρι τῶν πεδίων
και τῆς θαλὰττης...
The Picentes have come here from Sabina, under the guidance of a
woodpecker that showed the founders the way. Hence, they derive
their name: for they call this bird picus and they consider it
sacred to Ares. They are situated starting from the
mountains to the plains and the sea.

— Strabo, Geografia, 5. 4. 2.

Picena regio, in qua est Asculum, dicta, quod cum
Sabini Ausculum proficiscerentur in vexillo eorum picus
consederat.
The Piceno region, where one finds Asculum, is thus called
because when the Sabines took their journey towards
Ascolum, a woodpecker perched on their banner

— Sextus Pompeius Festus, De verborum significatu, 235 L.

Huius habitatores cum a Sabinis illuc properarent, in
eorum vexilio picus consedit, atque hac de causa Picenus
nomen accepit.
When the inhabitants of this region came here from the
Sabine territory, a woodpecker perched on their insignia and
from this was born the name of Piceno

— Paul the Deacon, History of the Lombards, II, 19

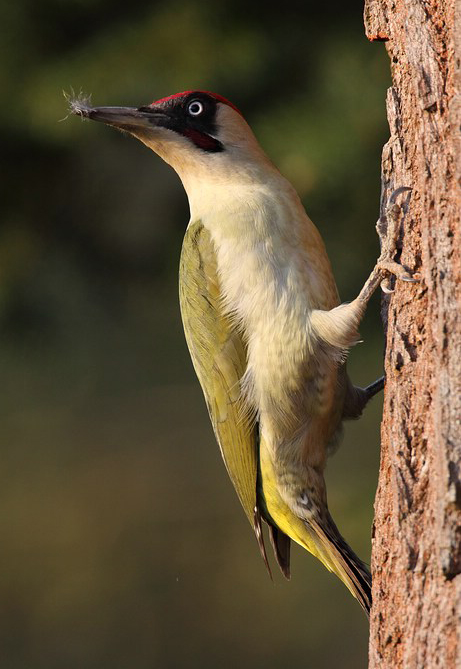
A European green woodpecker, the totem of the Picentes, according to Greek and Roman literary tradition.

== History ==
=== Duchy of Urbino ===
Flag of Duchy of Urbino

Banner of Arms of the Duchy of Urbino

The only historical evidence (around 1508) of the Duchy of Urbino flag is in a painting by Timoteo Viti stored at the Accademia di Brera in Milan. It appears to have two elongated tails. The background is golden yellow, the wheel located closer to the mast, essentially imitating the coat of arms of House of Montefeltro - blue and gold stripes, with a second stripe containing a black eagle, which has been the coat of arms of the city of Urbino for centuries.

=== Republic of Ancona ===
c. 1177-1532

The flag of the republic, which appeared in the second half of the 12th century and survived until its annexation to the Papal State (1532). The imperial gift of Byzantium, as a reward for merit and loyalty to Manuel I Komnenos, mirrored the Byzantine insignia, devoid of B-shaped symbols in the cantons. In more recent times (1934), Ancona took over the ancient nautical insignia, placing them on its city symbols, but the cross is Greek.

=== March of Ancona ===
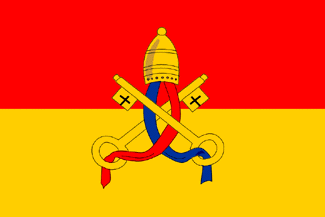
1532–1798

Following the loss of independence, Ancona entrusted its maritime tradition to the Pope and lowered its flag, replacing it with a simple red-yellow bicolor. Sometimes papal insignia were added.

=== Anconine Republic ===
1797–1798

Merchant flag

The Anconine Republic was established in 1797 and existed as a provisional sister republic. The flag in use from the proclamation of independence on 19 November 1797 until the union with the Roman Republic on 7 March 1798. It was intended for general use, but for the merchant fleet it was preferred to pick up the French tricolor. Yellow and red referred to the historic maritime republic. Blue has been added in tribute to France.

== Gallery ==
Flag of Marche proposed by Lega Nord
