= Repubblica Romana =

Repubblica Romana (Italian: Roman Republic) may refer to:

- Roman Republic (18th century)
- Roman Republic (19th century)
