= Republic of Cospaia =

Small independent Italian state (1441–1826)

Coordinates: 43°33′32″N 12°10′15″E

Republic of Cospaia Repubblica di Cospaia (Italian)
- 1440–1826
- Coat of arms
- Motto: Perpetua et firma libertas (Latin for 'Eternal and steadfast freedom')
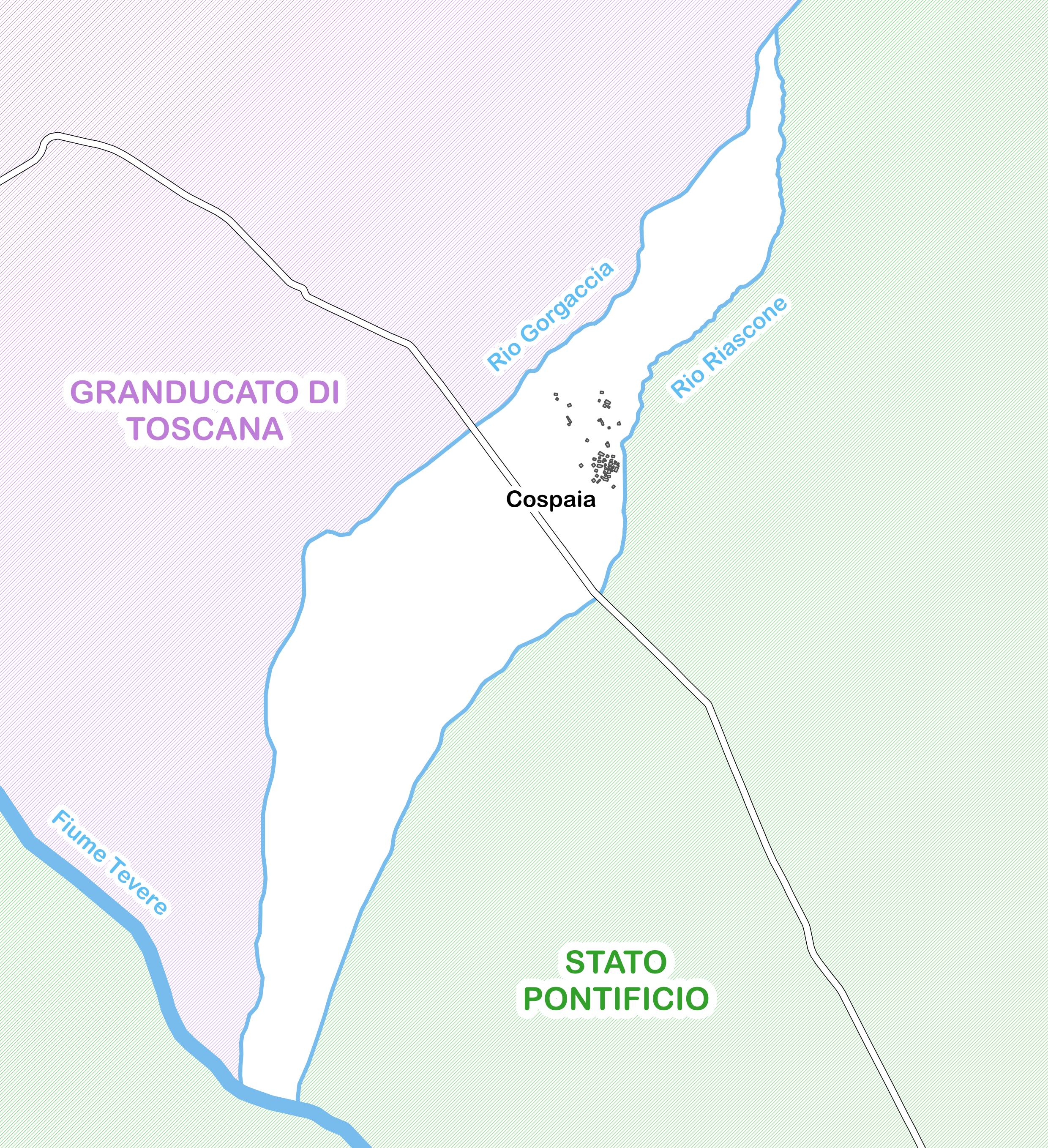
- Location of Cospaia
- Status: Microstate
- Capital: Cospaia
- Common languages: Italian
- Religion: Roman Catholicism
- Government: Stateless Republic
- Historical era: Early Modern
  - Established: 1440
  - Partitioned: 26 June 1826
- Currency: Ducat
Preceded by	Succeeded by
Papal States	Grand Duchy of Tuscany; Papal States

The Republic of Cospaia (Italian: Repubblica di Cospaia, local dialect: Republica de' Cošpäja) was a small microstate in northern Umbria, now in Italy, that was independent from 1440 to 1826. It was in what is now the hamlet (frazione) of Cospaia, in the municipality (comune) of San Giustino, in the Province of Perugia.

== History ==
Cospaia unexpectedly gained independence in 1440 after Pope Eugene IV, who was embroiled in a struggle with the Council of Basel, made a sale of territory to the Republic of Florence. By error, a small strip of land went unmentioned in the sale treaty, and its inhabitants declared themselves independent.

The boundary agreed between Florence and the Papal States was a stream, simply called "Rio"; but there were two such streams, about 500m apart, and each side considered the nearer "Rio" to be the relevant one. Thus, a terra nullius was formed, whose inhabitants declared themselves independent and no longer subject to any authority. In 1484, its independence was accepted by both Florence and the Papal States since they considered it not worth the trouble to redraw treaties in regard to an already-complicated border.

On May 25, 1826, Cospaia was divided between Tuscany and the Papal States. The treaty was signed by the 14 remaining family heads of Cospaia in exchange for a silver coin and permission to grow up to half a million tobacco plants a year.

=== Foundation ===
Republics, as a form of government, were most common in what is now Italy before the French Revolution. There had been, for example, the maritime republics (including those of Genoa and of Venice—albeit led by a sort of elective monarch styled "doge"— both with oligarchic institutions) along with the Republics of Pisa, Amalfi, Gaeta, Noli and the Ancona. And some were non-maritime: the Republic of Lucca (also with oligarchic institutions), the Republic of Florence, the Republic of Siena, and the Republic of San Marino (still in existence in the 21st century).

The inhabitants of Cospaia, therefore, preferred to base their independence on the total freedom of the inhabitants, all of whom were holders of sovereignty, and it was not entrusted to any organ of power, unlike in states. Cospaia also had an official flag, which is still used on some occasions. The banner was characterised by a black-and-white field divided diagonally. In the coat of arms there appeared "the village between the two small streams, with two fish on the right and the plant of Nicotiana tabacum on the left, above was the motto and years of the republic".

The inhabitants of Cospaia did not, therefore, have tribute obligations with either the Papal States or the Grand Duchy of Tuscany, and the goods that passed through the territory were not subject to any tariffs. It thus functioned as a free economic zone and buffer state between the two powers. Although Cospaia covered just 330 ha (2 km long and about 500 m wide), the 250 inhabitants treasured the location and took advantage of it to expand tobacco cultivation, among the first in the Italian Peninsula. Even now, some varieties of tobacco are still called cospaia. Cospaia was an early centre of tobacco production in Italy and used 25 ha of fertile soil to grow it. One of the reasons for the prosperity of Cospaia was that it was the only place in Italy that did not follow with the papal ban on tobacco growing, which ensured a monopoly on production.

=== End ===
After the Napoleonic Era, on 26 June 1826, with an act of submission by 14 representatives of the republic, Cospaia became part of the Papal States, and every inhabitant of Cospaia, as "compensation", obtained a papal silver coin and the authorisation to continue tobacco cultivation, which was taken over by rich local landowners such as the Collacchioni and the Giovagnoli, who bought most of the territory contained within the borders of the former republic. They extended tobacco production to the whole valley and imposed it as the principal agricultural commodity.

== Form of government ==
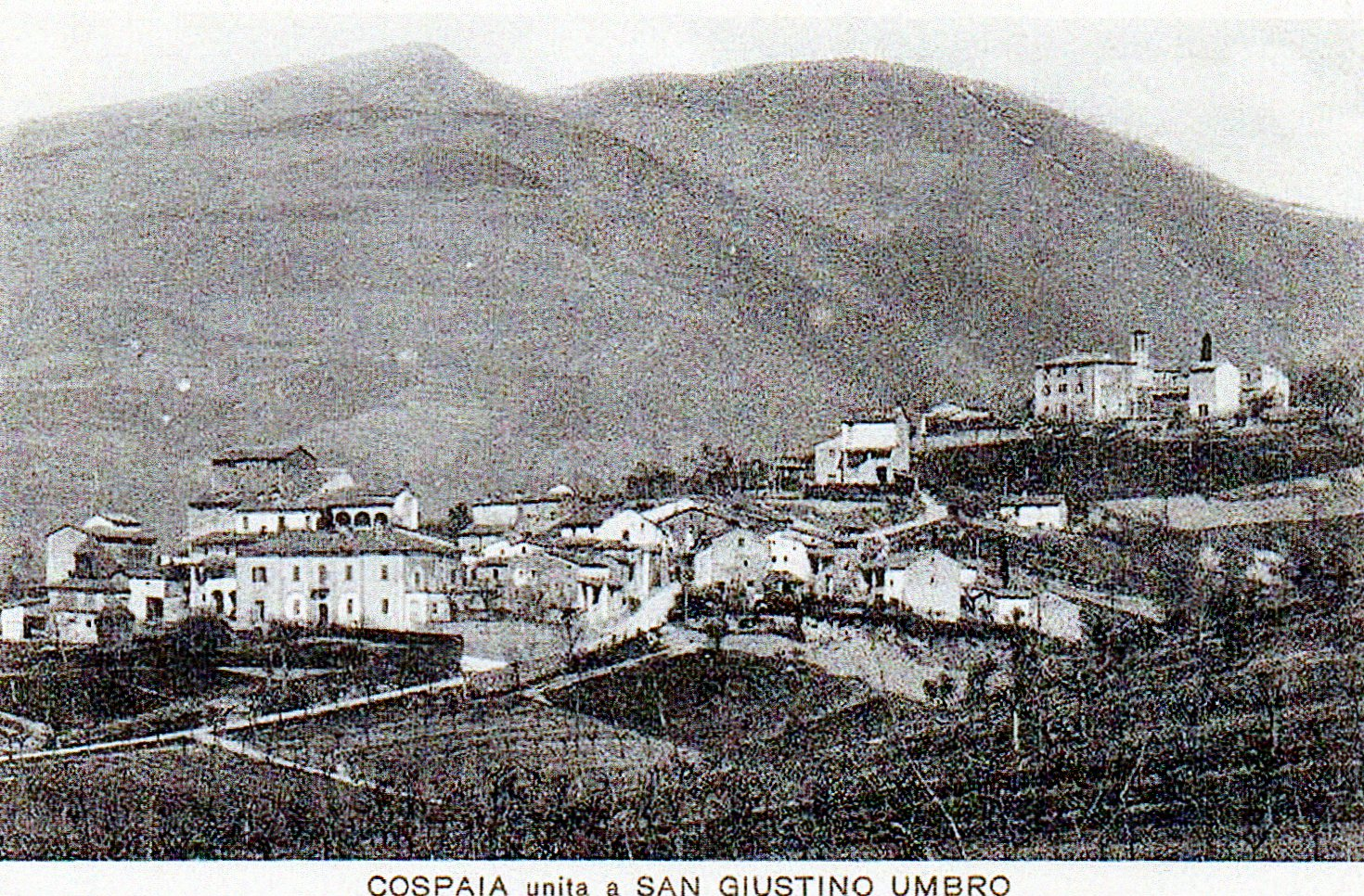
San Giustino Umbro, Cospaia

The Republic of Cospaia did not have a formal government or official legal system. There were no jails or prisons, and there was no standing army or police force. At the head of the administration was the Council of Elders and Family Heads, which was summoned for decision-making and judicial duties. The curate of San Lorenzo also took part in the meetings of the "Council of Elders", as "president", a position that was shared with a member of the Valenti family, the most important in the country. Council meetings were held in the Valenti house until 1718, when the council began to meet in the Church of the Annunciation, where it would stay until the republic's dissolution. On the architrave of the church door, one can still read the only written law of the tiny republic: Perpetua et firma libertas ("Perpetual and secure freedom"). The Latin phrase was also engraved on the parish bell.

After several centuries of existence, Cospaia was reduced to a mere receptacle of contraband. The concept of freedom was somewhat tarnished in favor of its privileges, which attracted people of all kinds: economic reasons or escaping the justice of the two large adjacent states. This situation was not unusual in small states, especially in border ones.

== See also ==
- List of historic states of Italy
- European microstates
- List of republics
- Liberland
- Seborga
