= San Giustino =

- Comune
- Comune di San Giustino
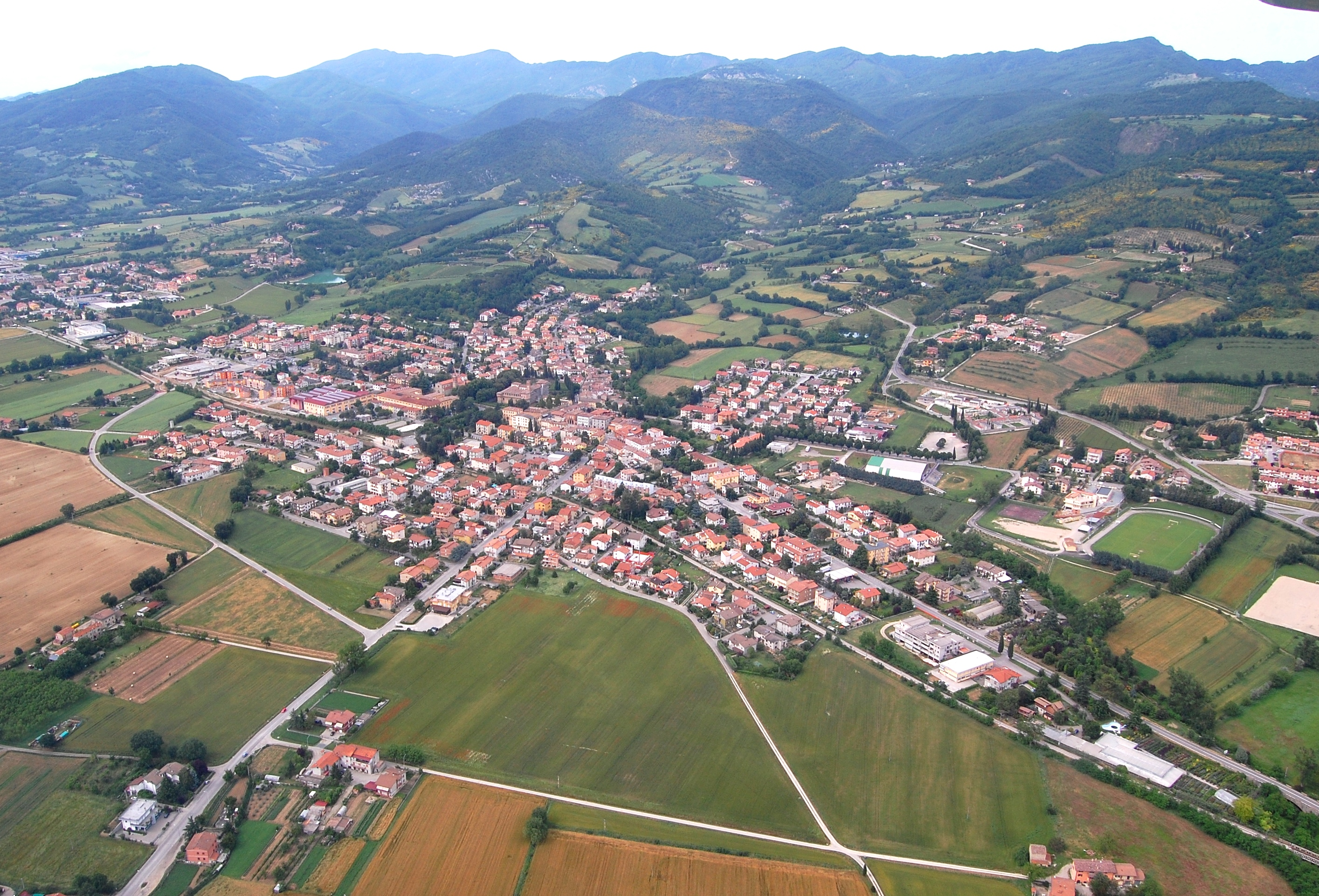
- View of San Giustino

- Location within Italy Location within Umbria
- Coordinates: 43.548452°N 12.176529°E
- Country: Italy
- Region: Umbria
- Province: Perugia (PG)

Area
  - Total: 80.7 km^{2} (31.2 sq mi)
- Elevation: 336 m (1,102 ft)

Population (1 January 2025)
  - Total: 11,060
  - Density: 137/km^{2} (355/sq mi)
- Demonym: Sangiustinesi
- Time zone: UTC+1 (CET)
  - Summer (DST): UTC+2 (CEST)
- Dialing code: 075
- Patron saint: St. Justin
- Saint day: 1 June
- Website: Official website

San Giustino is a comune (municipality) in the Province of Perugia in the Italian region Umbria, located about 50 kilometres (31 miles) northwest of Perugia on the Tiber River.

== Etymology ==
According to Adone Palmieri, the name of San Giustino derives from a Saint Justin, said to have been martyred on 10 September 303 at Pieve de' Saddi, located 16 miles (26 km) from the town.

== History ==
San Giustino is reportedly of ancient origin and remained for a long time under the influence of Città di Castello. In ancient Roman times it was a town named Meliscianum.

San Giustino is first mentioned in documents of the 9th century, which indicate that the fief belonged to the church of Arezzo. In 1265 the decaying walls of the castle were rebuilt.

In 1393 San Giustino passed to Pierleone di Silvestro Dotti of Sansepolcro, having been ceded by the municipality of Città di Castello. Around 1480 he completed defensive works on the fortress to strengthen control over the Tiber Valley. In 1482 the Dotti sold their rights over the fief, and about ten years later the castle was entrusted to Niccolò Bufalini, on condition that he complete the fortifications under the direction of Giovanni Vitelli and maintain a garrison in times of war.

Although the Bufalini initially obtained the castle as a papal fief, the grant was opposed by Città di Castello and revoked. In the 16th century the castle became the full property of the Bufalini family and was embellished and adapted for residential use.

Autonomous municipal status was granted in 1809 by Napoleonic decree, with Francesco Meocci appointed as the first mayor. After the fall of Napoleon, it was reabsorbed by Città di Castello. In 1827, under Pope Leo XII, it was elevated to a local administrative seat with judicial authority.

During the mid-19th century the territory was expanded with the incorporation of Cospaia. San Giustino had a population of 4,194 inhabitants in the same period.

Piedmontese troops under General Manfredo Fanti occupied the town in 1860, making it the first reached in Umbria. It was subsequently integrated into the Kingdom of Italy, with Pietro Polcri serving as its first mayor after annexation.

== Geography ==
San Giustino is situated in a valley near the foothills of the Apennines, on the right bank of the Tiber and close to the Tuscan border, at an elevation of 323 metres (1,060 ft) above sea level. It lies 7 miles (11 km) from Città di Castello and 2 miles (3.2 km) from Sansepolcro.

A nearby watercourse, the Vertola, flows close to the settlement.

The municipality borders Borgo Pace (PU), Citerna, Città di Castello, Mercatello sul Metauro (PU) and Sansepolcro (AR).

=== Subdivisions ===
The municipality includes the localities of Bagnaia, Ca' di Magnano, Ca' di Nardo, Ca' Torrioli, Cantone, Capanne Pian di Sotto, Casaccia, Case Nuove Seconde, Celalba, Corposano, Fiscale, Fiumicello, Gabriellone, Parnacciano, Petricce, Pitigliano, Renzetti, San Giustino, Sant'Anastasio, Selci-Lama.

In 2021, 769 people lived in rural dispersed dwellings not assigned to any named locality. At the time, the most populous localities were Selci-Lama (4,734), and San Giustino proper (4,584).

Selci, of ancient origin, was completely destroyed by an earthquake in September 1789; it was subsequently rebuilt and later developed into a populous village.

Colle, known as Colle di Plinio, is traditionally associated by some scholars with the site of the Roman Villa of Pliny "in Tuscis", identified in a locality called Santa Fiora, where remains of walls, aqueducts, marble fragments, mosaics and travertine column bases have been found. The large, elaborate villa belonged to the Plinys, Pliny the Elder and Pliny the Younger.

Celalba had already expanded by 1483 and was regarded as an important castle due to its elevated and strategic position, though it was affected by conflicts between the Virili and Vitelli families of Città di Castello.

Lama, which had about 80 inhabitants in 1264, developed over time thanks to its favorable location as a meeting point for the surrounding mountainous population, later acquiring commercial activity and a workforce of artisans and workers.

Cospaia existed as the independent Republic of Cospaia from 1441 until the early 19th century, originating from an error in the definition of borders between the Papal State and the Republic of Florence. Its territory was later divided between the two states, and the portion incorporated into San Giustino retained certain privileges, including the cultivation of tobacco. Now engulfed by surrounding development, Cospaia is no longer recorded as a separate census locality.

== Economy ==
In the mid-19th century a significant part of the population was engaged in the production of fine straw hats similar to those of Florence. The territory yielded abundant agricultural produce. The wooded areas produced fuel wood, charcoal and railway sleepers. Agriculture formed the basis of the local economy, with cultivation focused on cereals, tobacco and viticulture.

Silk production, which had previously supported many families due to the quality of its silkworm seed, was in decline by the late 19th century because of competition from large-scale establishments elsewhere in Italy.

== Religion and culture ==
=== Religious buildings ===
San Giustino is an archpriest parish with a church containing paintings, including one attributed to Squazzini, and an organ. The town's patron saint is Saint Justin, whose feast is celebrated on 1 June with a public festival.

=== Villa Magherini Graziani ===
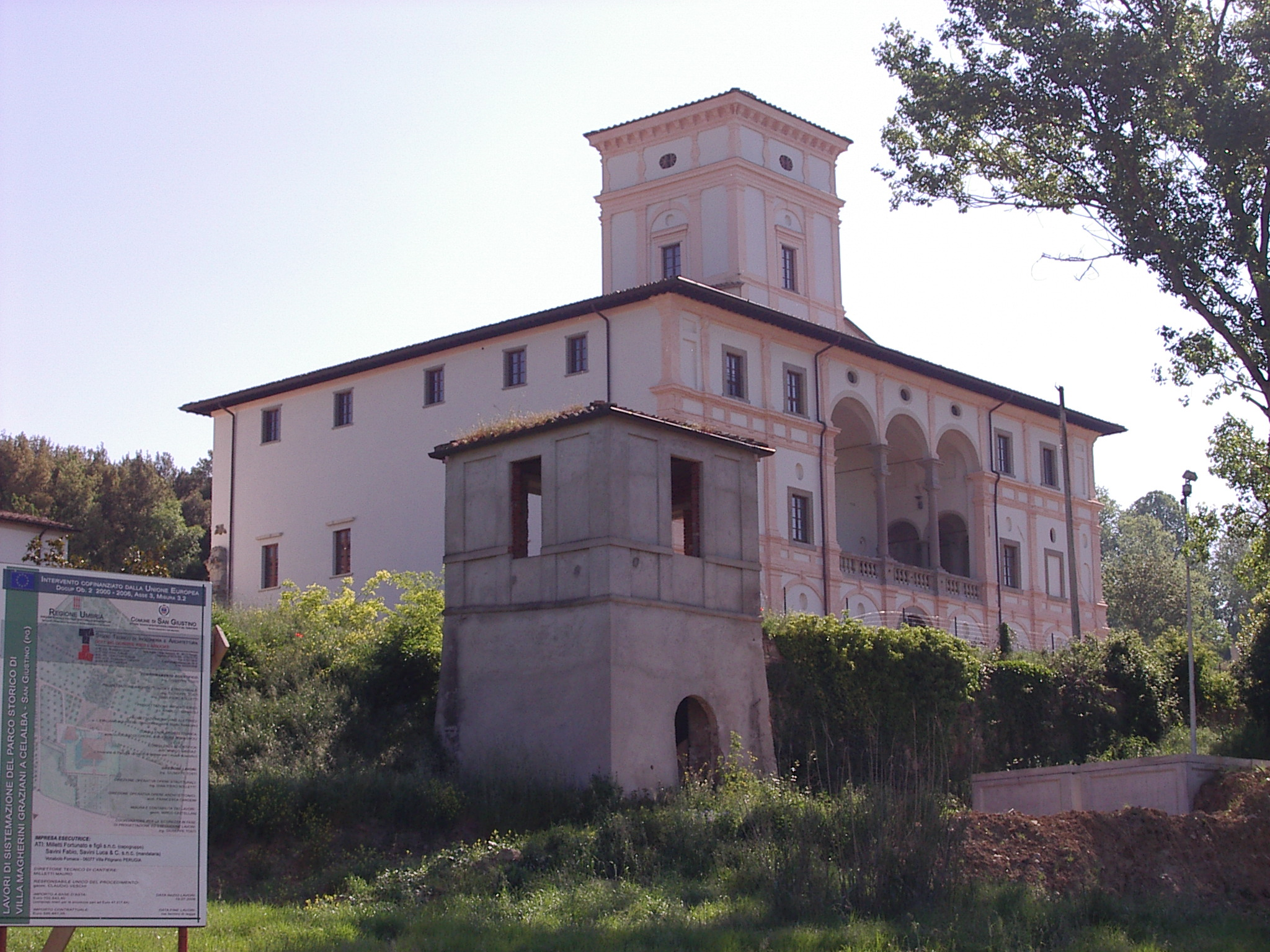
Villa Magherini Graziani

Villa Magherini Graziani was built in the early 17th century by Carlo Graziani of Città di Castello and stands on the remains of an earlier structure, of which only the central tower had survived.

The building, designed by Antonio Cantagallina and Bruni of Rome, was completed in 1616. It develops over three floors, with a mezzanine level, and features a late Renaissance façade distinguished by a central loggia with three arches extending across the upper levels. Inside, the principal room is a reception hall opening onto the loggia.

The surrounding grounds are enclosed within a pentagonal walled area and were originally arranged along the slope of the hill, later reorganized into terraced gardens.

=== Castle of San Giustino ===
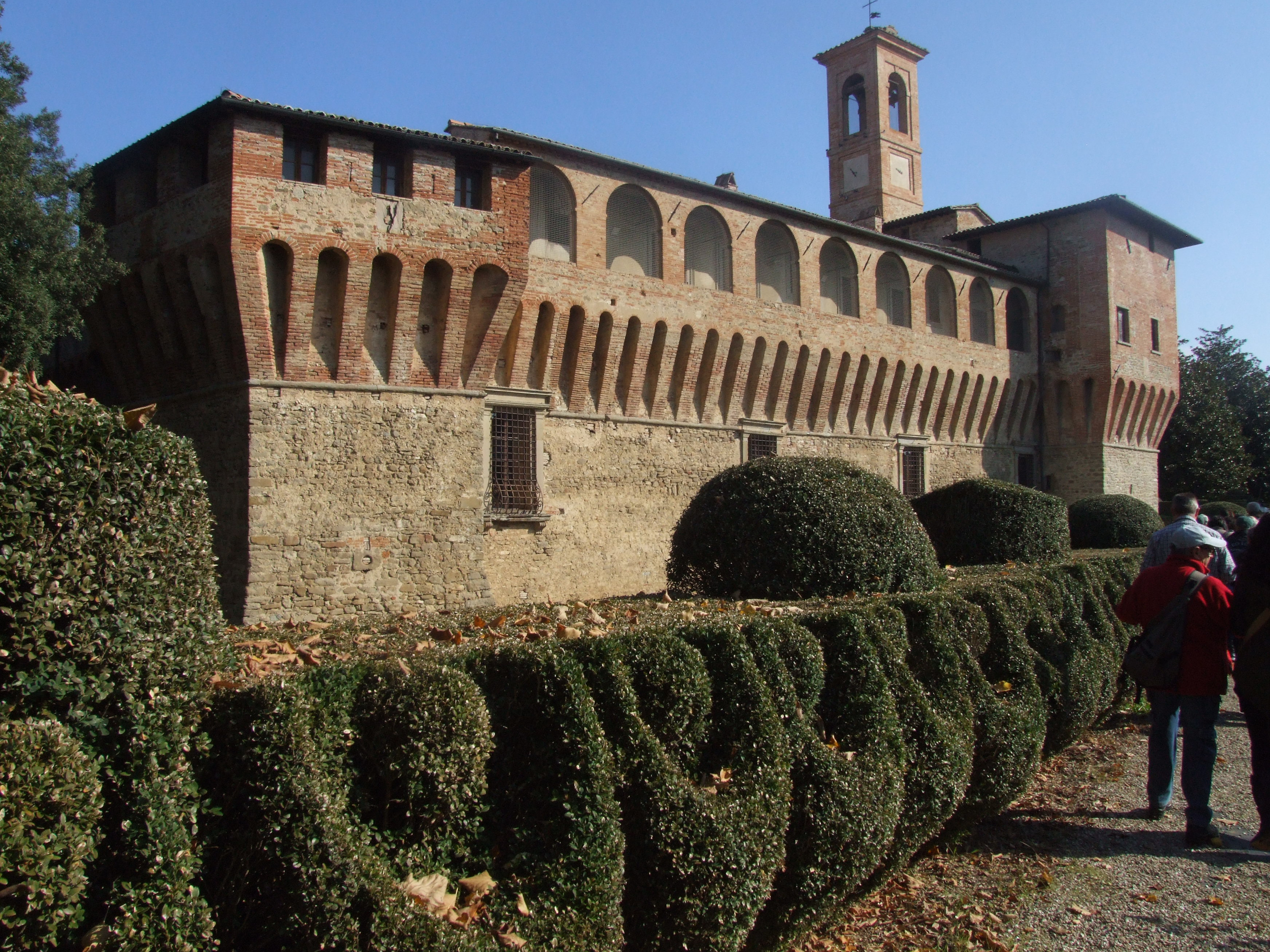
Castello Bufalini

The castle of San Giustino, built in brick and noted for its architectural proportions, contains paintings by Cristofano Gherardi commissioned by the abbot Bufalini. These works are mentioned by Giorgio Vasari, who described decorative schemes featuring putti, grotesques, festoons and masks.

=== Museo storico del tabacco ===
The Museo storico del tabacco reconstructs the different phases of production, including agricultural cultivation, pre-manufacturing processes such as leaf selection and treatment, and manufacturing processes leading to finished products such as snuff, cigars, and cigarettes.

The museum reflects the historical role of the Upper Tiber Valley, where tobacco cultivation was first introduced into Italy at the end of the 16th century within the territory of the former Republic of Cospaia.

== Notable families ==
The principal families associated with San Giustino include the Dotti and the Bufalini. Among those born in the town is Bruno Fattori, a poet who won a silver medal at the 1936 Olympic art competitions.

== International relations ==
=== Twin towns — Sister cities ===
San Giustino is twinned with:

- Prudnik, Poland
- Carros, France
