= Bruno Fattori =

Italian poet

Olympic medal record

Art competitions
| Silver medal – second place | 1936 Berlin | Lyric works |

Bruno Fattori (31 March 1891 – 15 October 1985) was an Italian poet. In 1936, he won a silver medal in the art competitions of the Olympic Games for his "Profili Azzurri" ("Azzurri Faces").

Fattori was born on 31 March 1891 in San Giustino. He died on 15 October 1985 in Pisa, at the age of 94.
