= Anconine Republic =

Former country

Anconine Republic Repubblica Anconitana (Italian)
- 1797–1798
- Flag

- Map of Province of Ancona within modern Italy
- Capital: Ancona
- Common languages: Italian
- Religion: Roman Catholicism
- Government: Revolutionary republic
- Consul
- Historical era: French Revolutionary Wars
  - Proclaimed: 17 November 1797
  - Disestablished: 7 March 1798
Preceded by	Succeeded by
Papal States	Roman Republic (1798–1799)
- Today part of: Italy

The Anconine Republic (Italian: Repubblica Anconitana) was a revolutionary municipality formed on 19 November 1797. It came about after a French victory at Ancona in February 1797, and the consequent occupation of the city. It existed in the region of Marche, with Ancona serving as its capital. Despite the Treaty of Campo Formio stating that Ancona and the surrounding region had to be returned to the Papal States, the municipality proclaimed the decadence of papal rule, under French protection. The subsequent tension led to general conflict with Pope Pius VI and the French occupation of the whole of the Papal States. Ancona was incorporated into the Roman Republic on 7 March 1798. A Pietro Reppi served as its head of state, titled the Consul.

Ancona is now a province of Italy, in the central part of the country on the Adriatic Sea.
