= Republic of Benevento =

Short-lived unrecognised state in Italy

Republic of Benevento Repubblica di Benevento (Italian)
- 1820–1821
- The triband of the Carbonari, the revolutionary organisation which declared Benevento independent

- Benevento within the Papal States, 1833
- Capital: Benevento
- Common languages: Italian
- Religion: Roman Catholicism
- Government: Revolutionary republic
- History
  - Proclaimed: July 1820
  - Disestablished: Spring 1821
Preceded by	Succeeded by
Papal States	Papal States
- Today part of: Italy

The Republic of Benevento was a short-lived unrecognised revolutionary state in southern Italy which unilaterally declared independence from the Papal States in 1820. It de facto administered the Papal exclave of Benevento until 1821 when it was occupied by the Austrian Empire and returned to the Papal States.

== Background ==
Having been under Papal administration for centuries, the exclave of Benevento was occupied by French forces during the Napoleonic Wars and briefly designated as the Principality of Benevento before it was returned to Papal control at the Congress of Vienna.

In Benevento, recent cultural developments had caused the rise of an active bourgeoisie and contributed to the stagnation of the patrician class. This allowed liberal fervour in the Kingdom of the Two Sicilies, driven by the revolutionary organisation of the Carbonari, to spread to the region.

== Revolution ==
In the light of the 1820 unrest in the Two Sicilies, which had forced the kingdom to liberalise, the Carbonari stimulated the revolution in Benevento. The Republic of Benevento was declared in July 1820 and the progressive Spanish constitution was adopted by the new nation.

Benevento requested twice to be incorporated into the Two Sicilies, though these attempts were rejected both times as the Two Sicilies refused to negotiate the affairs of Benevento except through the Pope, who they continued to recognise as sovereign over the area.

== Downfall ==
In the spring of 1821, the short-lived republic was militarily occupied by the forces of the Austrian Empire which intervened in south Italy to restore Benevento to Papal rule.

== In literature ==
Political greatness, a sonnet by P.B. Shelley, derived inspiration from the revolution in Benevento. The poem displayed a questioning attitude towards the concept of political revolution.
