= Tiberina Republic =

Revolutionary Italian municipality in 1798

Coordinates: 43°6′44″N 12°23′20″E

Tiberina Republic Repubblica Tiberina (Italian)
- 1798–1798
- Flag

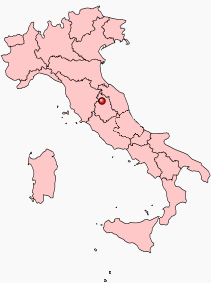
- Map of Perugia within modern Italy
- Capital: Perugia
- Common languages: Italian
- Government: Republic
  - Consul: Angelo Cocchi
- Historical era: French Revolutionary Wars
  - Proclaimed: 4 February 1798
  - Disestablished: 7 March 1798
Preceded by	Succeeded by
Papal States	Roman Republic (18th century)

The so-called Tiberina Republic (Italian: Repubblica Tiberina) was a revolutionary municipality proclaimed on 4 February 1798, when republicans took power in the city of Perugia. It was an occupation zone that took its name from the river Tiber. A month later, the government of all the Papal States was changed into a republic: the Roman Republic, which Perugia belonged to. Its head was a consul and it used a tricolor similar to the French flag.
