= Marquisate of Fosdinovo =

Medieval Fiefdom in Italy

Marquisate of Fosdinovo Marchesato di Fosdinovo (Italian)
- 1355–1797
- Shield of the Malaspina family
- Motto: Sum mala spina bonis (Latin for 'I am a good thorn in the bad')
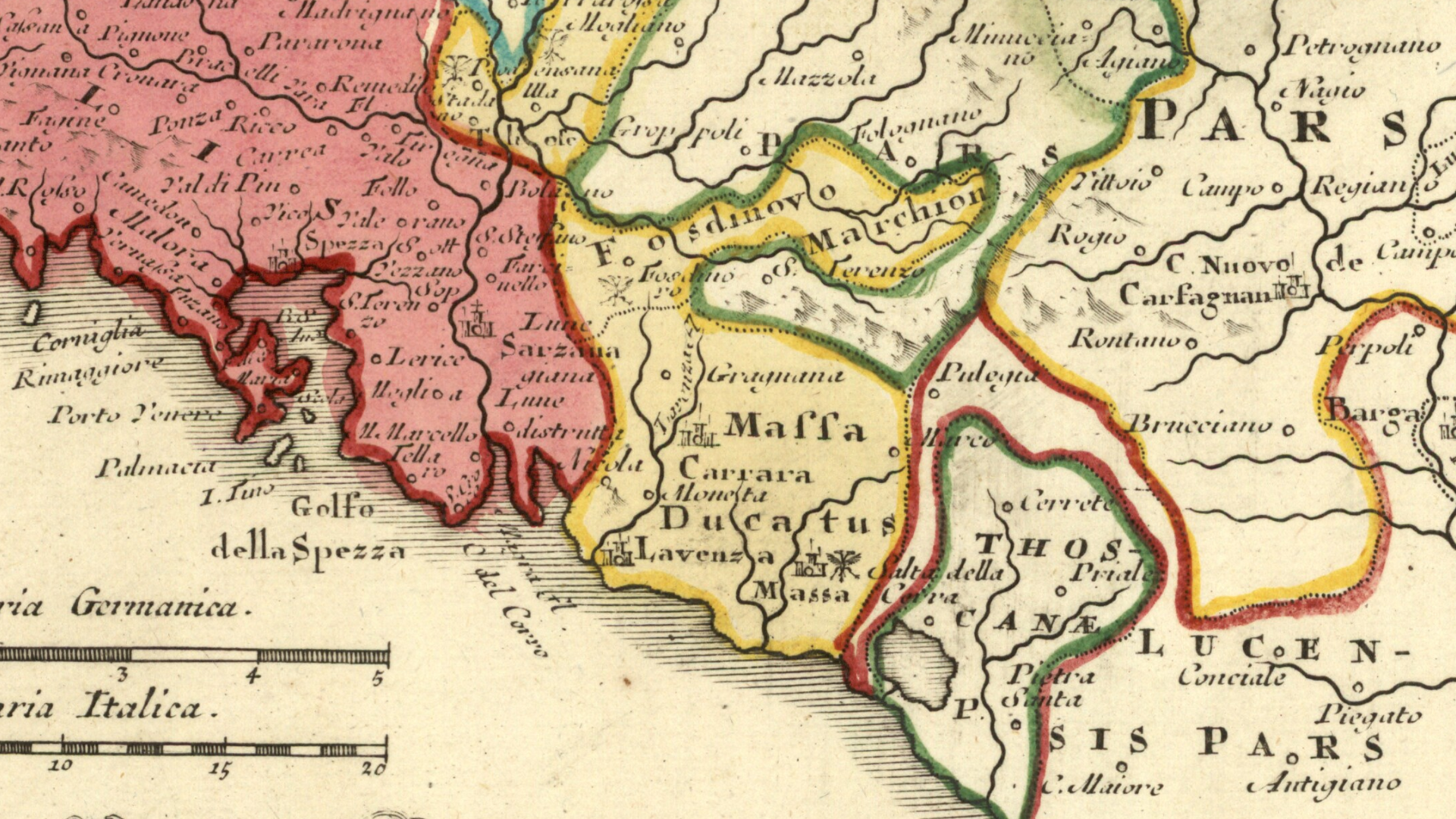
- Fosdinovo (yellow, north of Massa and Carrara).
- Status: Marquess, Fief
- Capital: Fosdinovo
- Common languages: Italian
- Demonym: Malaspinans
- Government: Monarchy
- Marquess
  - 1355– c. 1393 (first): Galeotto I
  - 1759–1797 (last): Carlo Emanuele
- History
  - Conquered by the Malaspinas: 1355
  - Annexation to the Cisalpine Republic: 1797
- Currency: Liguino
Preceded by	Succeeded by
Roman Catholic Diocese of Luni; Republic of Lucca	Cisalpine Republic
- Today part of: Italy

The Marquisate of Fosdinovo was a small fiefdom, led by a Marquess, that existed in the Italian peninsula between 1355 and 1797. It was based around Fosdinovo, a city east of La Spezia, and was ruled by the Malaspinas, a prominent Italian family, throughout its existence.

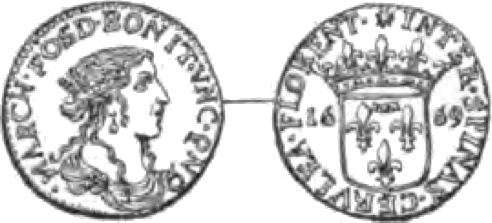
Liguino Coin Minted in Fosdinovo

== Founding of the Marquisate ==
The Marquisate of Fosdinovo was established around 1355 when Emperor Charles IV of Luxembourg visited the area and granted the rank of Marquisate to Galeotto I Malaspina. The area Galeotto I took control of had been owned by the Bishops of Luni and had been occupied by Lucca not long before this. In 1393, Galetto I died, and his sons split the Marquisate into small territories for themselves.

Under Gabriele II (1467 - 1508), the Marquisate developed and expanded significantly. in 1468, an oratory was built, followed by several other religious buildings in the next few decades.

== End of the Marquisate ==
Carlo Emanuele became the ruler of the Marquisate in 1759, thirty years before the French Revolution and the Revolutionary Wars began. Eventually, the fiefdom was occupied by the Republic of France. With the conclusion of the Napoleonic Wars and the establishment of the Congress of Vienna, Fosdinovo was put under the control of the Duchy of Modena and Reggio. Towards the end of the 19th century, descendants of the Marquises that formerly ruled over the country regained possession of the town's castle. They still own it to this day.

== Bibliography ==
- Giovan Battista Bianchi, Fosdinovo. I suoi Signori e i suoi Marchesi, ed. Felici, Pisa 2002.
- Eugenio Branchi, Storia della Lunigiana feudale, Beggi, Pistoia 1898.
- Massimo Dadà (a cura di), Fosdinovo, ed. Giacche, La Spezia 2010.
- Umberto Dorini, A great feudatory of the Trecento. Spinetta Malaspina, Olschki, Firenze 1940.
