= Roman Republic (1798–1799) =

Republic on the Italian Peninsula (1798–1799)

Roman Republic Repubblica Romana (Italian)
- 1798–1799
- Flag Coat of arms
- Motto: Il popolo solo è sovrano (Italian) The people alone are sovereign
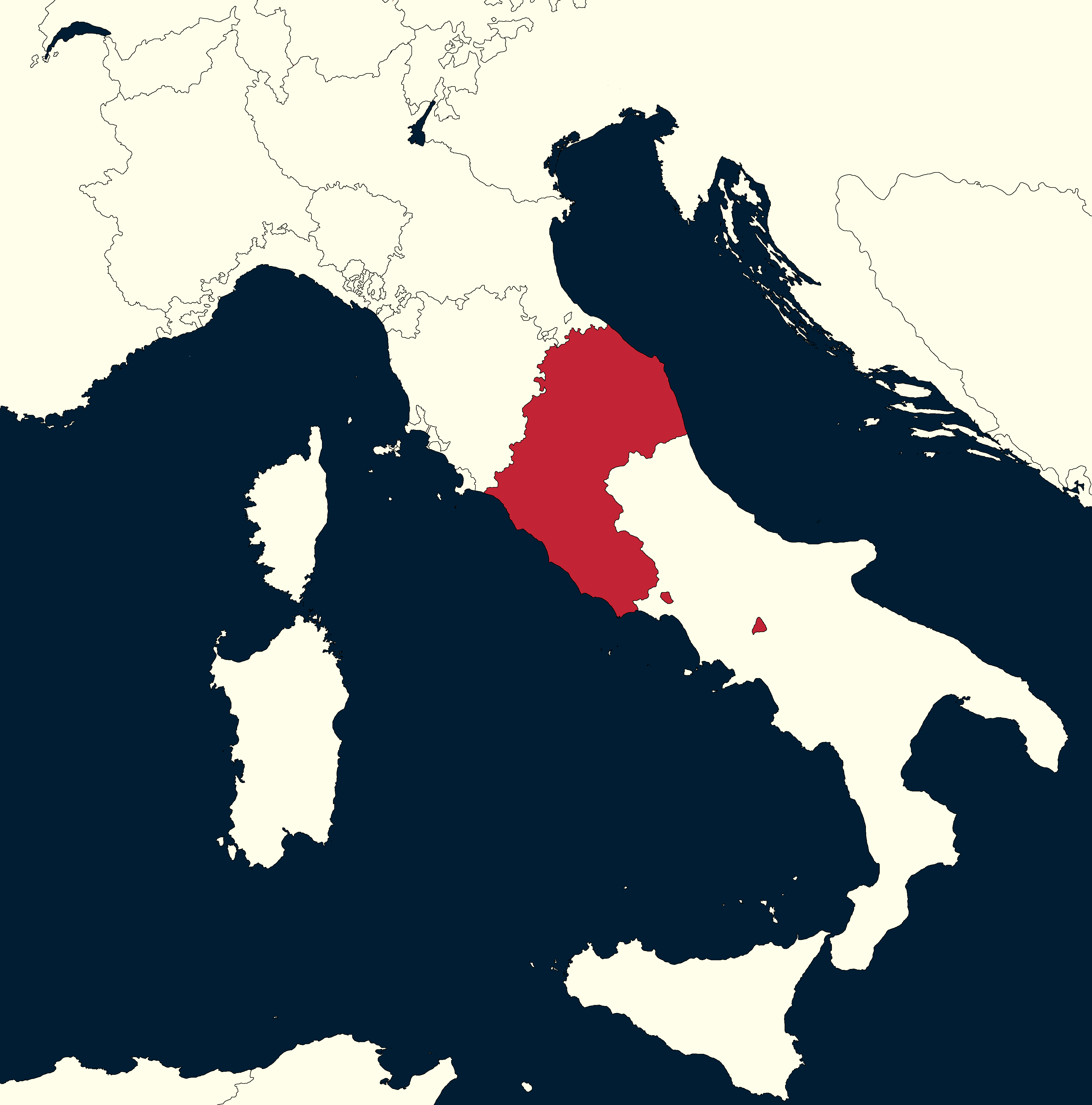
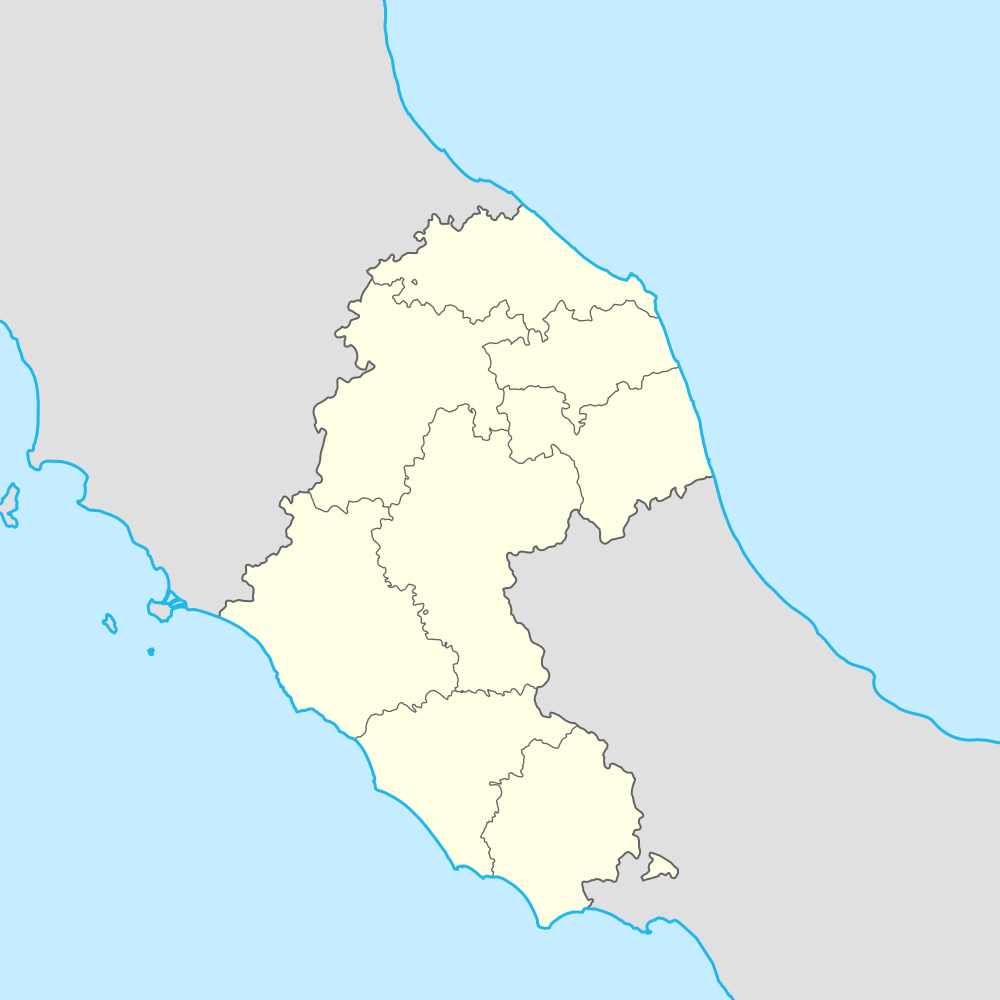
- Status: Sister republic of Revolutionary France
- Capital: Rome
- Common languages: Italian
- Government: Unitary directorial republic
- Directory
  - 1798–99: Consulate
- Legislature: Legislative Council (Tribunate & Senate)
- Historical era: French Revolutionary Wars
  - Republic proclaimed: 15 February 1798
  - Neapolitan occupation: 30 September 1799
- Currency: Roman scudo, Roman baiocco
Preceded by
Papal States
Anconine Republic
Tiberina Republic
Succeeded by
Papal States
- Today part of: Italy; Vatican City

Alternative Coat of Arms of the Roman Republic (1798–99)

The Roman Republic (Italian: Repubblica Romana) was a sister republic of the French First Republic that existed from 1798 to 1799. It was proclaimed on 15 February 1798 after Louis-Alexandre Berthier, a general of the French Revolutionary Army, had occupied the city of Rome on 11 February. It was led by a Directory of five men and comprised territory conquered from the Papal States. The Roman Republic immediately incorporated two other former-papal revolutionary administrations, the Tiberina Republic and the Anconine Republic. It proved short-lived, as Neapolitan troops restored the Papal States in October 1799.

== Background ==
During the French Revolutionary Wars, the Papal States, under the temporal authority of the pope in Rome, was part of the First Coalition. After defeating the Kingdom of Sardinia early in the Italian campaign of 1796–1797, General Napoleon Bonaparte turned his attention south of Piedmont to deal with the Papal States. Bonaparte, skeptical over divided command for the invasion, sent two letters to the French Directory. The letters convinced the Directory to delay the invasion of the Papal States for a while. On 3 February 1797, the French defeated the pope's army at the Battle of Faenza. Under the Treaty of Tolentino, signed on 19 February, Pope Pius VI was forced to accept an ambassador of the French First Republic.

On 27 December 1797, General Léonard Duphot, a military attaché at the French embassy in Rome, was killed while trying to defuse a riot in front of the embassy. After throwing himself between the rioters and papal troops, he was shot by the soldiers and later lynched by a mob in front of the Porta Settimiana. Duphot's death led to the departure of the French ambassador, Joseph Bonaparte, and his entourage.

== History ==
The Directory decided that Duphot's killing would be avenged. The next year, French troops under General Louis-Alexandre Berthier invaded the Papal States and occupied Rome on 11 February 1798. Berthier proclaimed the Roman Republic on 15 February 1798, while Pope Pius VI was taken prisoner, escorted out of Rome on 20 February and exiled to France, where he later died. The institutions of the new sister republic were organized on the French model by Gaspard Monge and Pierre Daunou, with the help of local revolutionaries such as the engraver Francesco Piranesi and French residents of Rome such as Joseph-Antoine Florens.

On 24 February 1798, on the occasion of a ceremony for General Duphot, hundreds of French soldiers gathered in front of the Pantheon and addressed their grievances to generals Berthier and André Masséna, commander of the Army of Rome (Armée de Rome). The soldiers demanded the payment of salaries and the punishment of those responsible for looting during the invasion of the Papal States. Masséna refused to acknowledge the soldiers' demands, but after they stormed the Palazzo Ruspoli he committed to pay part of the soldiers' salaries within 48 hours and the rest within two weeks. At the same time, Berthier negotiated with the officers in revolt.

The next day, Masséna ordered the withdrawal of the French army to the other bank of the Tiber in order to disperse the military insurrection. However, a civilian uprising, quickly defeated, broke out in multiple districts of Trastevere. The officers then attempted to have Masséna dismissed. At the end of these two days of unrest, Masséna moved out of the city and Berthier left the Roman Republic. Claude Dallemagne, then provisional commander of Rome, found himself in charge of the city amid contradictory directives from Berthier and Masséna. New insurrections broke out on 2 March, when the officers refused to follow Masséna's order for a transfer of troops. On the 14th of March, when the latter returned to Rome, the revolting officers called for his dismissal, his departure within 24 hours, and the granting of powers to Dallemagne while awaiting orders from the Directory.

New orders arrived in Rome on 18 March, indicating a strengthening of the authority of the civil commissioners, the transfers of Berthier to the Army of England and of Masséna to Genoa, and the attribution of powers in the city to General Laurent de Gouvion Saint-Cyr with orders to arrest the officers involved in the insurrections.

The Kingdom of Naples invaded the Roman Republic in November 1798. Although initially victorious at Ferentino, the French evacuated Rome and a Neapolitan army entered the lightly guarded city unopposed on 29 November, the very day that the War of the Second Coalition had begun. Nevertheless, French troops led by General Jacques MacDonald, governor of the Roman Republic, and General Jean Étienne Championnet, commander of the Army of Rome, defeated the Neapolitans at Ferentino, at Civita Castellana on 5 December, and at Otricoli on 9 December, re-entering Rome on 14 December. Championnet would go on to occupy Naples in January 1799 and proclaim the Parthenopean Republic.

Following a second Neapolitan invasion on 30 September 1799, the Papal States were restored under the rule of Pope Pius VII in June 1800, bringing the Roman Republic to an end. The French Army invaded the Papal States again in 1808, after which it was partitioned between the First French Empire and the Napoleonic Kingdom of Italy until the end of the Napoleonic Wars in 1815.

== Government ==
The Roman Republic's constitutional organization was heavily influenced by that of the French Constitution of 1795, which itself was inspired by and loosely based on that of the ancient Roman Republic. Executive authority was vested in five consuls. The legislative branch was composed of two chambers, a 60-member Tribunate and a 30-member Senate, which elected the consuls.

== Gallery ==
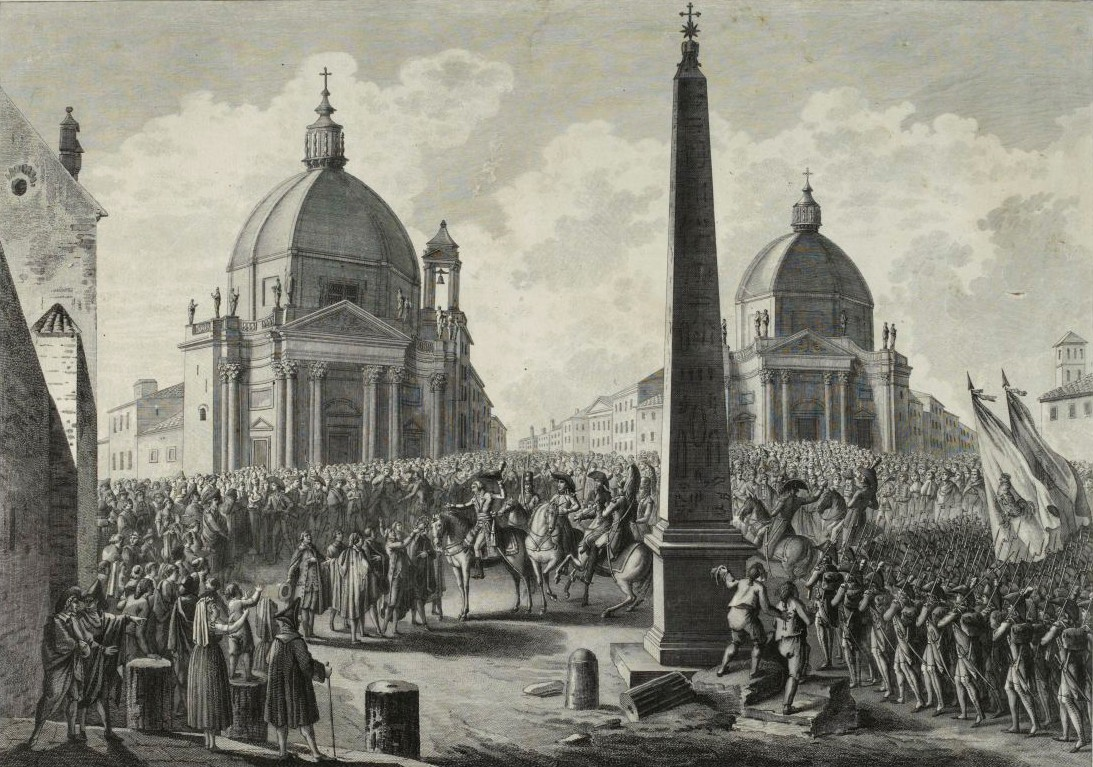
Entry of the French army into Rome on 15 February 1798 (Musée de la Révolution française)

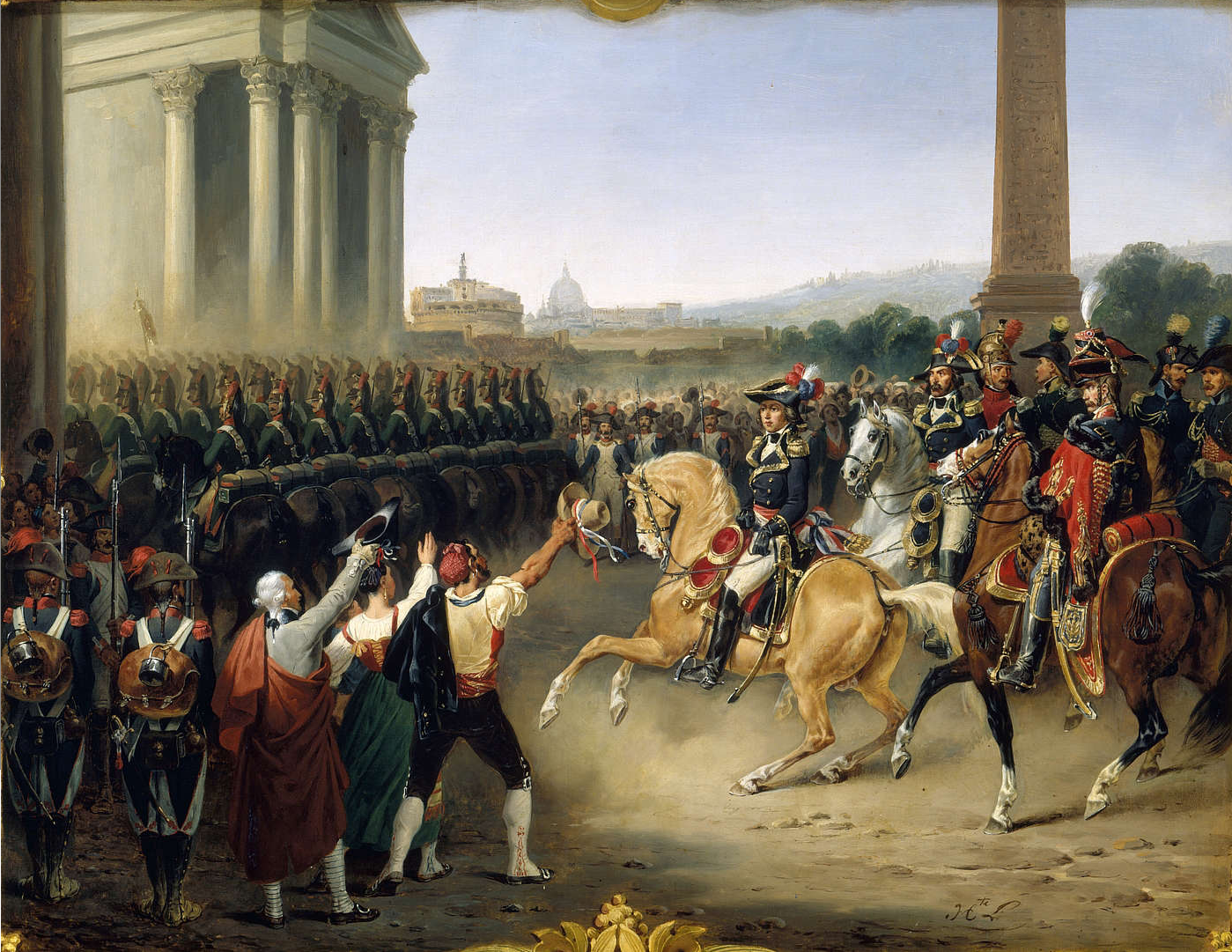
Entry of the French army into Rome on 15 February 1798 (Palace of Versailles)

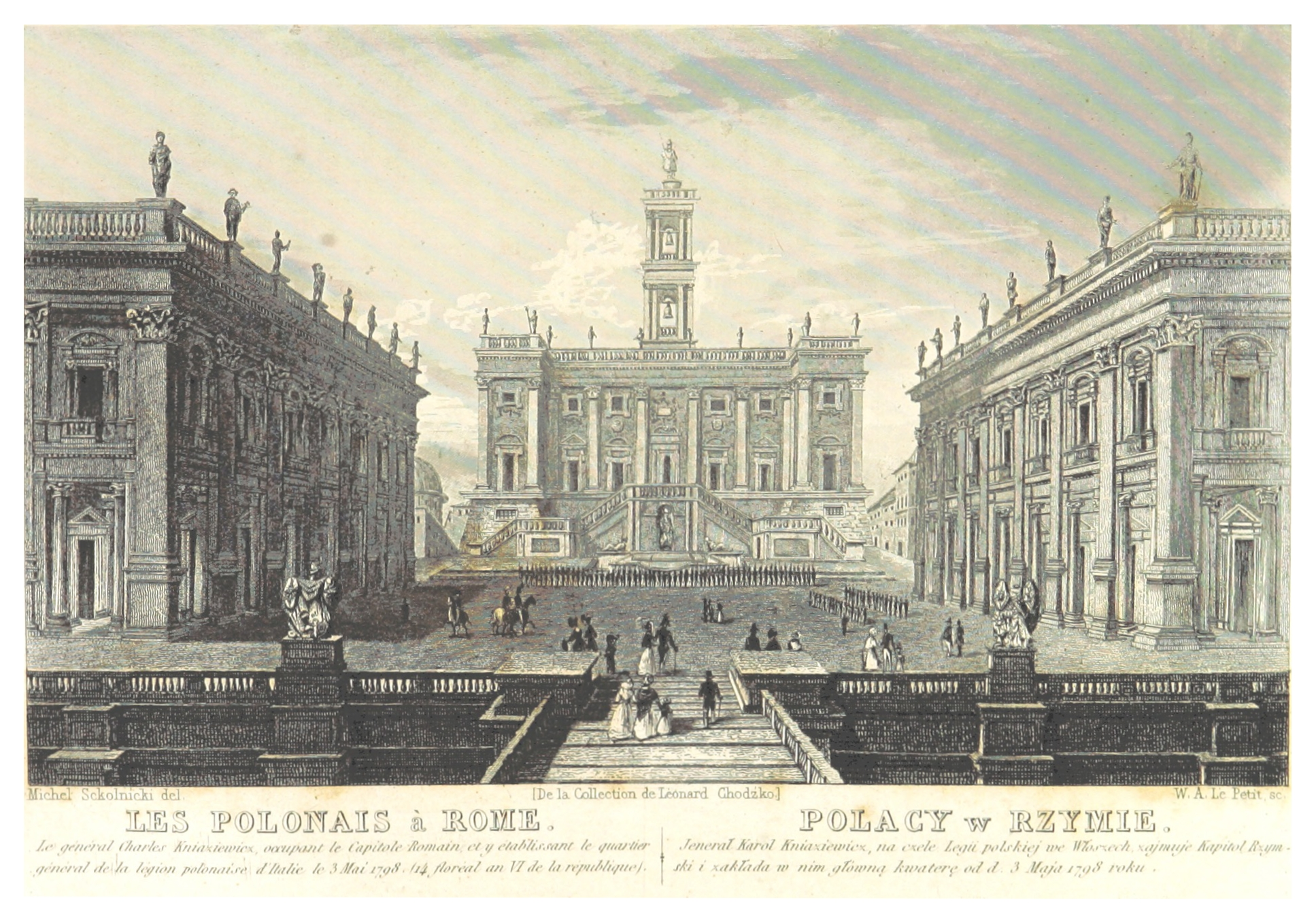
Polish legionnaires on Capitoline Hill, May 1798

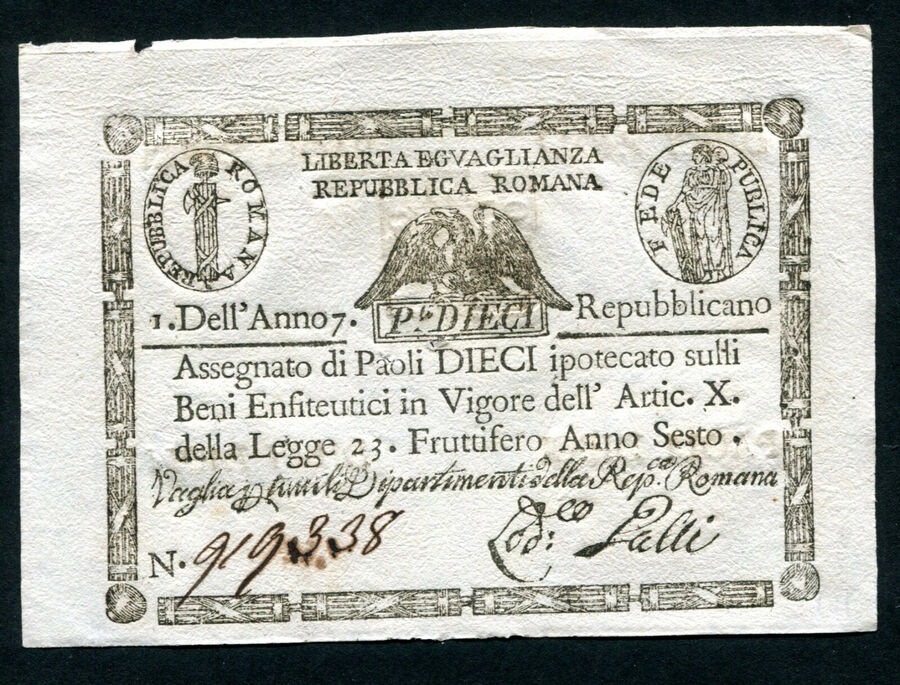
Assegnato issued by the Roman Republic

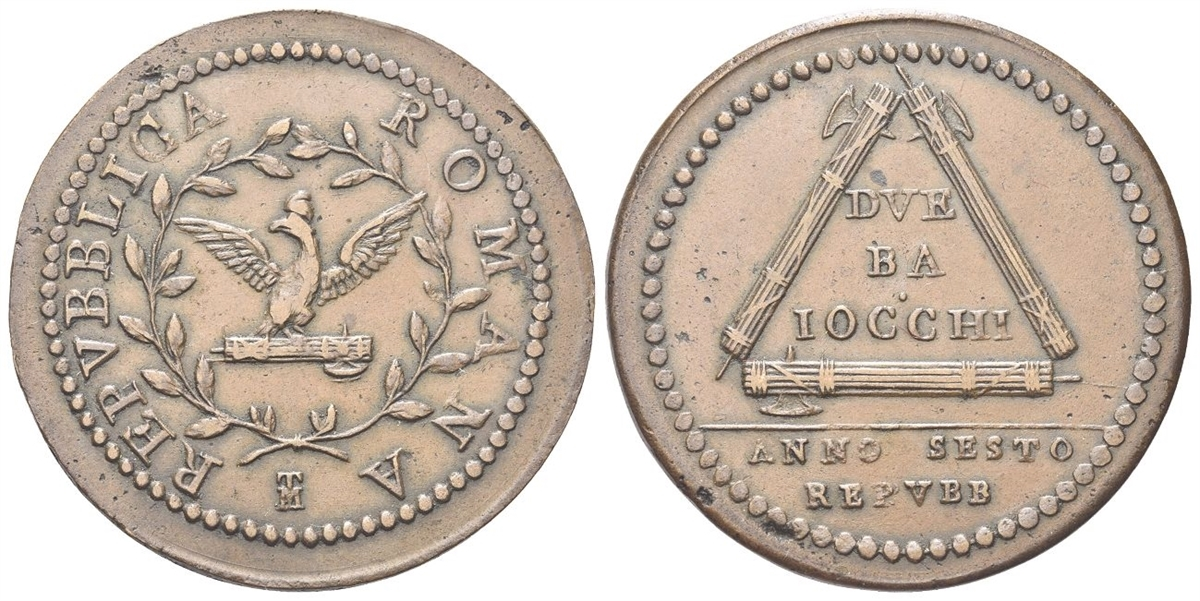
2 baiocchi coin minted by the Roman Republic

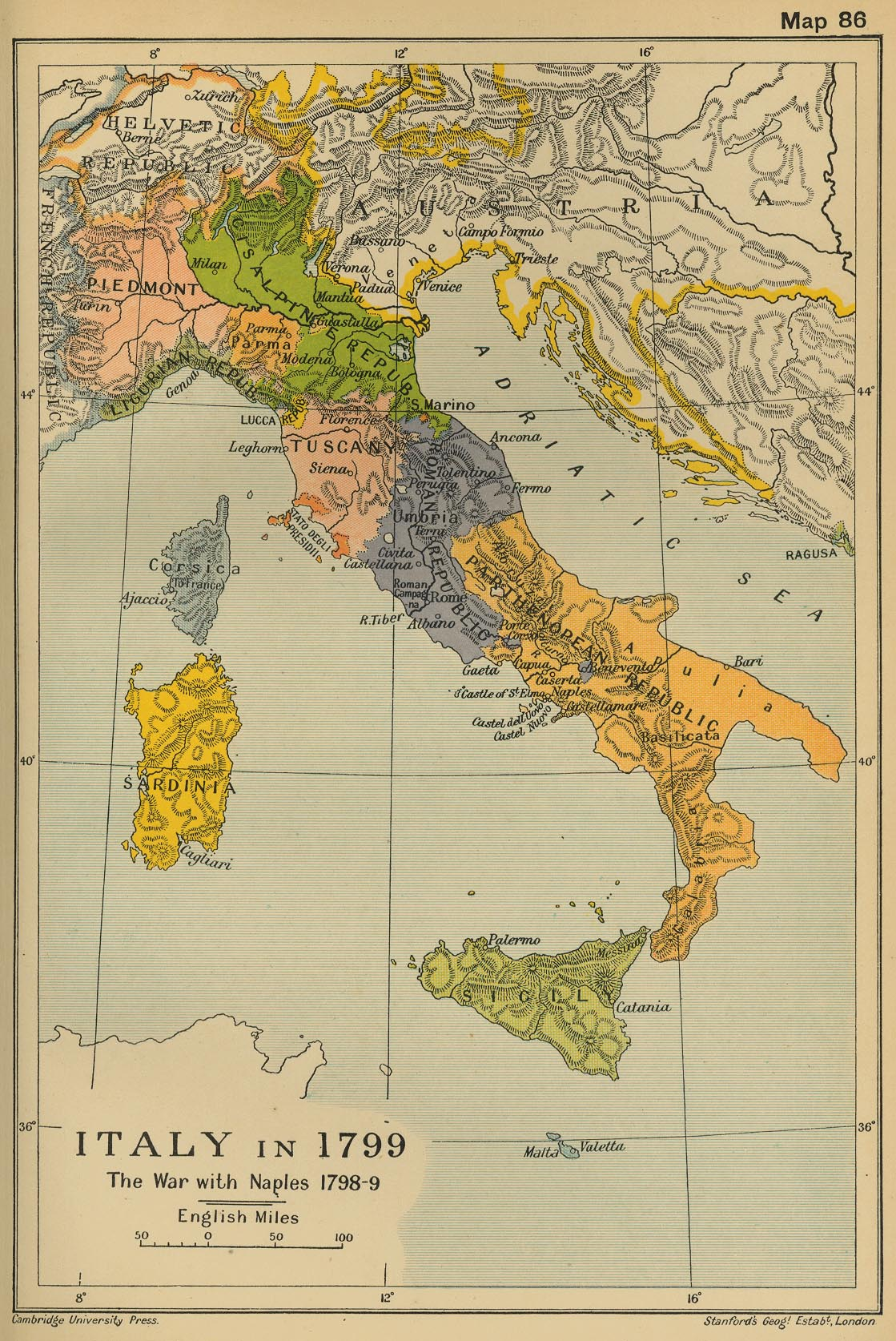
Early modern Italy in 1799

== See also ==
- Quum memoranda
- List of historical states of Italy
- Napoleonic looting of art
- Unification of Italy (1848–1871)
