= Johnny the Partisan =

2000 Italian war drama film

- Film poster
- Directed by: Guido Chiesa
- Written by: Guido Chiesa; Antonio Leotti
- Produced by: Domenico Procacci
- Starring: Stefano Dionisi; Fabrizio Gifuni; Andrea Prodan; Toni Bertorelli; Felice Andreasi; Alberto Gimignani; Fabio De Luigi; Giovanni Esposito; Barbara Lerici; Giuseppe Cederna; Umberto Orsini
- Cinematography: Gherardo Gossi
- Music by: Alexander Bălănescu
- Production company: Fandango
- Release date: 2000
- Country: Italy
- Language: Italian

Il partigiano Johnny, internationally released as Johnny the Partisan, is a 2000 Italian war drama film set in the Second World War and directed by Guido Chiesa. It is based on the novel of the same name by Beppe Fenoglio.

The film entered the competition at the 57th Venice International Film Festival, in which it won the Children and Cinema Award.

== Plot ==
Johnny, a university student with a passion for English literature, deserts the Italian Army in Rome after the September 1943 Badoglio Proclamation, and returns home to Alba. He initially takes refuge in a villa in the hills, where he devotes himself to his studies. After the death of a friend, he decides to fight in the war again. He leaves the city and joins the first partisan formation he meets, the "Reds", led by Biondo. He doesn't share their communist ideology, only their desire to fight the Fascists.

Left alone after the group has dispersed under a German attack, he manages to reach a formation of the Badogliani, also called "Blues", or "Autonomous", led by the charismatic North Commander (Piero Balbo, nicknamed Nord). This group is in contact with the Anglo-American allies, who are better equipped and organized. Among them, he meets his dear friend Ettore, and together they participate in the temporary, symbolic occupation of Alba.

Multiple small clashes decimate and disperse their forces, and Ettore is captured and sentenced to death. Johnny finds himself facing the hard winter of 1944 alone again. In the spring, Nord gathers the men and resumes guerrilla activities. The film ends on a still shot of Johnny engaged in combat, perhaps overwhelmed by enemies, followed by the words "Two months later, the war was over".

== Cast ==
- Stefano Dionisi as Johnny
- Fabrizio Gifuni as Ettore
- Andrea Prodan as Pierre
- Alberto Gimignani as Biondo
- Claudio Amendola as Nord
- Giuseppe Cederna as Nemega
- Umberto Orsini as Pinin
- Chiara Muti as Elda
- Lina Bernardi as Johnny's mother
- Toni Bertorelli as Johnny's father
- Felice Andreasi as miller
- Barbara Lerici as Sonia
- Flavio Bonacci as Pietro Chiodi
- Antonio Petrocelli as Leonardo Cocito
- Lucio Zagaria as Dario Scaglione
- Fabio De Luigi as Fascist deserter
- Giovanni Esposito as southern partisan
- Flavio Insinna as spy
- Sergio Trojano as Ivan
- Andrea Bruschi as Set

== See also ==
- List of Italian films of 2000
