= Piero Balbo =

Italian Resistance leader during World War II

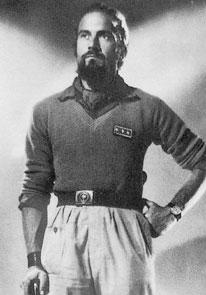
- Born: 12 June 1916; Manjimup, Australia
- Died: 19 March 2003 (aged 86); Asti, Italy
- Military career
- Allegiance: Kingdom of Italy
- Branch: Regia Marina
- Rank: Lieutenant
- Commands: 2nd Autonomous Partisan Division "Langhe"
- Conflicts: World War II; Italian Civil War; Battle of Alba
- Awards: Silver Medal of Military Valor

Piero Balbo (Manjimup, 12 June 1916 – Asti, 19 March 2003) was an Italian Resistance leader during World War II.

== Biography ==
He was born in Australia, where his family lived for seven years, and after returning to Italy he graduated in law and became a lawyer. In 1940, following the Italy's entry into the Second World War, he was called up for service by the Royal Italian Navy and assigned to the 12th MAS Flotilla in Leros with the rank of Sub-Lieutenant and later Lieutenant, spending most of the war there. At the time of the Armistice of Cassibile he was in Pola, where he was captured by the Germans on 11 September 1943, but was able to escape and return home on a bicycle. He then joined the partisan groups that had formed in the Langhe after the German occupation of Italy, with the nom de guerre "Comandante Nord" and "Poli". In reprisal for his partisan activities, the Germans burned down his house in Cossano Belbo in March 1944.

Balbo joined Enrico Martini's 1st Alpine Division Group, quickly rose through its ranks and, as commander of the 2nd Autonomous Division "Langhe", was tasked with the preparation and defence of the landing field at Vesime, used by the Allies to provide support to the partisans. He participated in the liberation of Alba in October 1944 and its unsuccessful defence against the German and Fascist counteroffensive in the following month. On 24 February 1945 his father, Giovanni Balbo, who had also joined the partisans, was killed in combat near Santo Stefano Belbo, for which he was posthumously awarded the Gold Medal of Military Valor). "Nord" himself was awarded the Silver Medal of Military Valor. He died in Asti in 2003.

Balbo is featured in Beppe Fenoglio's novel Johnny the Partisan.
