= Enrico Martini =

Italian soldier and partisan

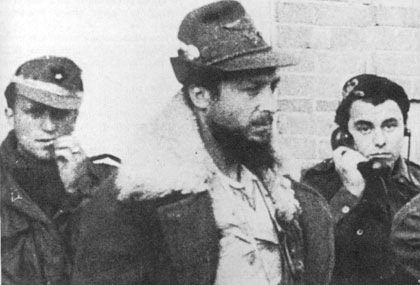
- Born: 29 January 1911; Mondovì
- Died: 19 September 1976 (aged 65); Turkey
- Military career
- Allegiance: Kingdom of Italy
- Branch: Regio Esercito, Italian Resistance
- Service years: 1936–1945
- Rank: Tenente Colonnello (Lieutenant Colonel)
- Nickname: Mauri
- Units: 5 Alpine Division Pusteria (1936); 1 Group Alpine Divisions; others
- Commands: 1 Group Alpine Divisions
- Conflicts: Second Italo-Abyssinian War, Western Desert Campaign; Italian Campaign
- Awards: Gold Medal of Military Valor, Cross of Merit (Poland), Order of Merit of the Italian Republic, Bronze Star Medal, War Cross for Military Valor

Enrico Martini (nom de guerre "Mauri") Mondovì, 29 January 1911 – Turkey, 19 September 1976) was an Italian soldier and partisan, an Alpini Major, founder of the 1 Group Alpine Divisions in the Italian Resistance, and a recipient of the Gold Medal of Military Valor.

== Biography ==
Upon leaving Liceo Classico, Martini entered the Modena Military Academy in 1929; after graduation he was assigned to the Alpini Corps where he started his officer career. In 1936 he participated in the Second Italo-Abyssinian War with 7th Reggimento Alpini of 5 Alpine Division Pusteria; during this campaign he received the Croce di Guerra for the gallantry demonstrated in the battle of Lake Ashenge.
In April 1941 he was sent to North Africa where he remained until Spring 1943, taking part to the battles in Marmarica and in the Egyptian desert. He received three more awards for military valor and advanced to the rank of Maggiore (Major).

=== Resistance leader ===
Repatriated in the spring of 1943, he was assigned to the Regio Esercito General Staff, where he stayed up till 8 September 1943, on which date he took part to the battle of Rome, embedded in a Grenadier unit.

Later, he traveled back to Piedmont to join units belonging to the Italian Fourth Army, so as to carry on the anti-German resistance.

He was captured by the Germans and interned in the Apuania concentration camp, from which he managed to escape and he reached his native province of Cuneo on 17 September.

A supporter of the Italian monarchy, he set up the first network of units from the valleys around Cuneo, in the Langhe, in the Monferrato: in twenty months of unstinting and merciless fighting against Nazi and Fascist forces, he raised 1 Gruppo Divisioni Alpine (1 Group Alpine Divisions) within C.V.L. which, at the time of the final uprising of 25 April 1945 consisted of nine partisan Divisions roughly numbering ten thousand men each. He largely contributed to the liberation of Turin, Asti, Alessandria, Alba, Bra, Mondovì, Ceva, Savona, after paying a toll of nine-hundred dead and one thousand wounded or mutilated to the cause of freedom.

Up to the end of the war, 1 Gruppo Divisioni Alpine earned eleven medals on the field, of which 3 Medals of Military Valor. The entire dossier of 1 Gruppo Divisioni Alpine is stored in the archive of the Piedmontese "Giorgio Agosti" Institute for the History of the Resistance and contemporary society.

==== Confrontation with the CLN ====
"Mauri" even had some trouble in being recognized as a commander by the Cuneo provincial branch of the National Liberation Committee which did not deem him sufficiently well-known. "Mauri"'s reply was sharp: "... In fact, in twenty months of war waged on two thirds of that province, I haven't had the pleasure to know that a local CLN existed. But I do not bother to know today either. |Mauri, Con la Libertà e per la libertà, pag. 9"

=== Postwar period ===
At the end of the war he became a member of the Consulta Nazionale (National Council) as a representative of the Formazioni Autonome (non-political partisan units), and a strenuous supporter of the award of the Gold Medal of Military Valor to the city of Alba by means of a letter sent to the Piedmontese military commission, whereas the Silver medal had been officially proposed.

In 1947 he requested and obtained the transfer to the military reserve, leaving active Army service with the rank of Tenente colonnello (Lieutenant Colonel).
He earned a degree in Law at the Università di Torino and became a company executive.

In 1971 he entered the Committees of Democratic Resistance, raised by fellow monarchist partisan Edgardo Sogno with "anti-communist" goals.

He died in a plane crash in Turkey on 19 September 1976.

== Literature ==
- Johnny the Partisan (Il partigiano Johnny) by Beppe Fenoglio

== Bibliography ==
- A. Spinardi, Mauri e i suoi, collana storica della Resistenza cuneese, Cassa di Rispramio di Cuneo, 1994
- R. Amedeo, Alba libera, Fossano, 1980
- Enrico Martini, Noi del 1º Gruppo Divisioni Alpine, Torino, 1945
- Enrico Martini, Con la libertà e per la libertà, Società editrice torinese, Torino, 1947
- Enrico martini, Partigiani penne nere: Boves Val Maudagna, Val Casotto, Le Langhe, Arnoldo Mondadori, Milano, 1968, 265pag
- Di Domenico De Napoli, Antonio Ratti, Silvio Bolognini, La resistenza monarchica in Italia (1943–1945), Guida
- Piero Negri, Luca Bufano, Pierfrancesco Manca, Chicco De Luigi, Il partigiano Fenoglio: uno scrittore nella guerra civile, Fandango libri, 2000, ISBN 88-87517-09-6, 127pag

== Honors and awards ==
Gold Medal of Military Valor

Maggiore in servizio permanente effettivo (Major and career officer) in the Alpini Corps - Partisan

First promoter of the Resistance in the Monregalese, organizer of the early armed parties in Val Maudagna and Val Casotto, after proving to be a skilled commander in the course of hard fighting, he gathered a couple thousand of combatants, coordinating all partisan activity in the Langhe and lower Monferrato. In Summer and Autumn 1944 he occupied, in cooperation with other formations, the city of Alba. At the start of Winter, as many as two German Divisions were unsuccessfully sent in to take the area back. In governing the civilian population in the provinces of Cuneo, Asti, Alessandria, and part of the province of Savona, he showed preeminent maturity of judgement, organizational skill, balance, energy, brotherly and heartfelt interest, so much that he was remembered with favor even in the years to come. In early Spring 1945, with his own forces he occupied Alba, Canelli, Nizza Monferrato, Monesiglio and, during the general insurrection he also liberated Savona, Ceva, Mondovì, Fossano, Bra, Racconigi, Carmagnola, eventually reaching Turin with his group of Partisan divisions.

Southern Piedmont and Northwestern Liguria, September 1944 to 25 April 1945.

Bronze Star

Order of Merit of the Italian Republic

War Cross for Military Valor

Cross of Merit (Poland)

=== Acknowledgements ===
On 12 November 1947 the city council of Alba, Piedmont conferred him the honorary citizenship.

"Maggiore Martini Enrico, a.k.a. commander "Mauri" was an organizer and chief of the Autonomous partisan formations in the Langhe. He brought his spirit of initiative and indomitable courage to the dangerous mission. The city of Alba gave him Honorary Citizenship as a sign of praise, and in his name exalts the partisans from all formations and their Commanders who, fighting in the Alba area from 1943 to 1945, were meritorious leaders in the cause of the Liberation.|Alba 12 November 1947"

Alba and Turin both dedicated a street to his name.

== See also ==
- Raffaele Cadorna Jr.
- Republic of Alba (1944)
- Garibaldi Brigades
- Ettore Ruocco
- Innocenzo Contini
- Pietro Augusto Dacomo
- Nicola Monaco
- Piero Balbo
