= Una questione privata =

Una questione privata may refer to:

- A Private Matter (book), an Italian novel by Beppe Fenoglio
- Rainbow: A Private Affair, an Italian film by Paolo and Vittorio Taviani
