= Republic of Alba =

Revolutionary municipality (1796)

Coordinates: 44°42′N 8°02′E

Republic of Alba Repubblica di Alba
- 1796
- Flag
- Capital: Alba
- Common languages: Italian, French
- Religion: Roman Catholicism
- Government: Republic
- Historical era: French Revolutionary Wars
  - Established: 26 April 1796
  - Disestablished: 28 April 1796
- Currency: French franc Sardinian lira
| Preceded by | Succeeded by |
| Duchy of Savoy | Duchy of Savoy |
- Today part of: Italy: Piedmont

The Republic of Alba (Italian: Repubblica di Alba) was a revolutionary municipality proclaimed on 26 April 1796, in Alba, Piedmont, when the town was taken by the French army. The municipality had a very short life of only 2 days because, with the Armistice of Cherasco on 28 April 1796, King Victor Amadeus III of Sardinia was given back the civil control of all Piedmont.

== History ==
At the time the republic was proclaimed, Piedmont was the main part of the Kingdom of Sardinia which, despite its name, had its core on the mainland; Turin was its capital city. The kingdom suffered a first French Revolutionary invasion in April 1796: the Montenotte campaign. After a string of French victories, Italian patriot and Jacobin Giovanni Antonio Ranza proclaimed a republic in the town of Alba (therefore historically known as the 'Republic of Alba') as a replacement of the Sardinian monarchy on Piedmontese territory on 25 or 26 April 1796. Ranza had been agitating for an independent Piedmontese republic ever since 1793; he saw such a state as a first step towards a republic encompassing all of Italy. Ranza and his fellow rebels then presented an address to French general Napoleon Bonaparte, calling on him to liberate the whole of Italy from 'tyranny'. However, Bonaparte ignored their pleas, and wrote to the French Directory that the Piedmontese people were not politically ready, and that 'you should not count on a revolution in Piedmont.'

French military commanders at the time had no interest in this project of an Italian sister republic, and it already ended on 28 April 1796 with the Armistice of Cherasco, which gave most of Piedmont (except for Alessandria, Coni and Tortone, which were annexed by France) back to the Sardinian king, who had to withdraw from the First Coalition. The final peace Treaty of Paris on 15 May 1796 led to loss of the duchy of Savoy, Nice, Tende and Beuil to France, and guaranteed military access to French troops crossing Piedmontese soil. The ultrashort-lived Republic of Alba would serve as the later Piedmontese Republic's predecessor.

== Flag ==
The flag of the Republic of Alba was designed by the jacobin Giovanni Antonio Ranza, who said that the blue and red were for France while the orange is taken to the tree of the Piedmont's shield. The orange was also the personal colour of Mr. Ranza: he fantasised his surname Ranza as a corrupted form of Italian arancia, meaning 'orange', in order to avoid the actual meaning of ranza in his own Piedmontese language, which is "scythe". The blue, red and orange flag existed in both horizontal and vertical tricolour versions, and it is used nowadays on some occasions by the region Piedmont.

== See also ==
- Piedmontese Republic
- Subalpine Republic
- Republic of Alba (1944)
