= Gallery of sovereign state civil ensigns =

This gallery of sovereign state civil flags shows the civil ensigns of sovereign states that appear on the list of sovereign states. Each flag is depicted as if the flagpole is positioned on the left of the flag.

== A ==
Albania

Andorra

Antigua and Barbuda

Australia

Austria

== B ==
Bahamas

Bangladesh

Belgium

Bolivia

Brunei

== C ==
Cameroon

Canada

Colombia

Costa Rica

Croatia

== D ==
Dominican Republic

== E ==
Dominica

Ecuador

El Salvador

== F ==
Fiji

Finland

== G ==
Germany

Ghana

Grenada

Guatemala

== H ==
Haiti

Hungary

== I ==
India

Israel

Italy

== L ==
Luxembourg

== M ==
Malaysia

Malta

Mauritius

Morocco

== N ==
New Zealand

Nigeria

== P ==
Pakistan

Peru

Poland

== S ==
San Marino

Serbia

Singapore

Spain

Switzerland

== T ==
Tuvalu

== U ==
United Arab Emirates

United Kingdom

== V ==
Venezuela

== See also ==
- Armorial of sovereign states
- Flags of micronations
- List of national flags by design
- List of aspect ratios of national flags
