= Federico Eusebio Civic Museum of Archaeology and Natural Sciences, Alba =

Coordinates: 44.6986°N 8.0356°E

Museo Federico Eusebio
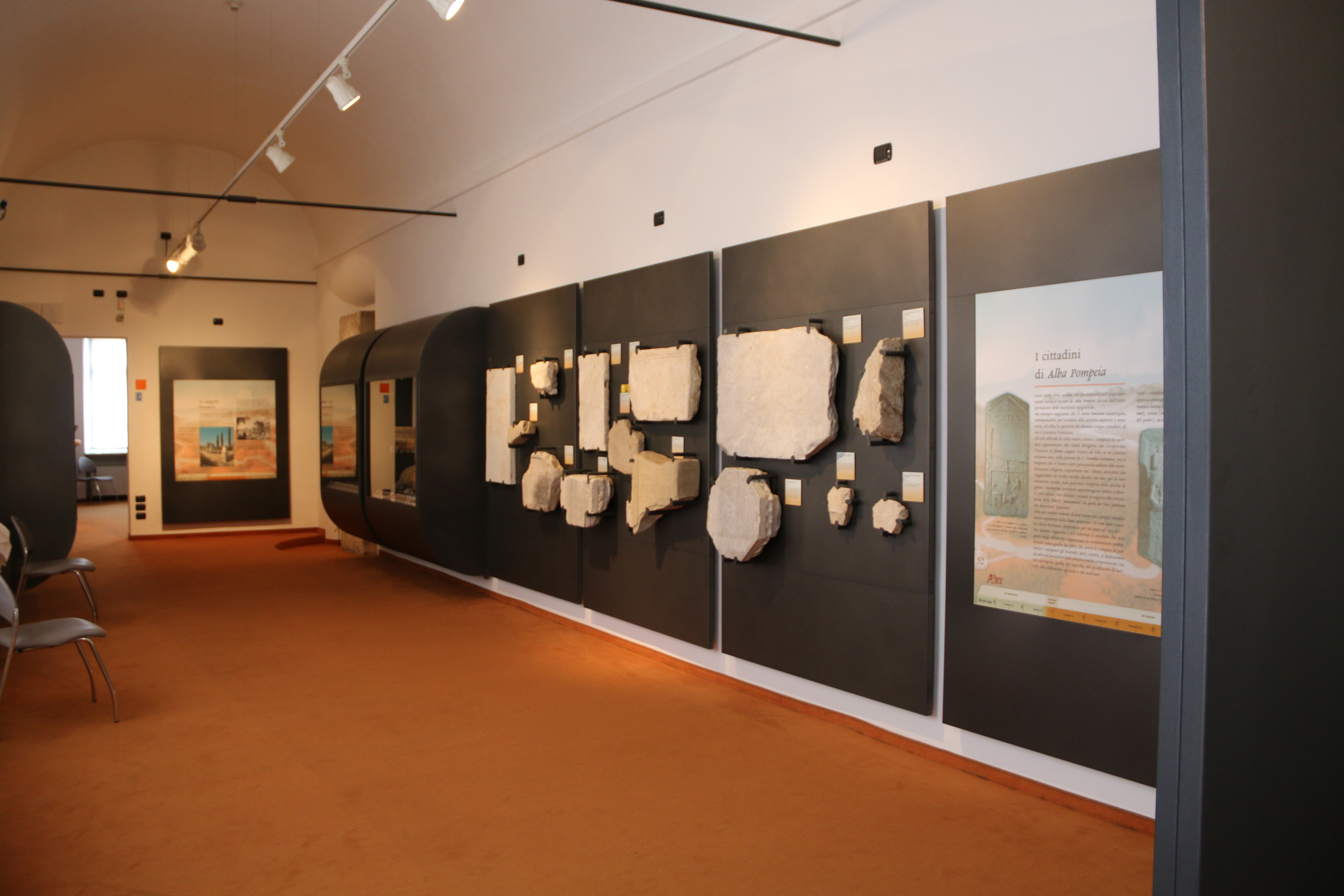
- First floor display of Ancient Roman inscriptions
- Location: Alba, Piemont
- Type: Archaeology and Natural Sciences museum
- Website: Comune of Alba, entry on museum

Museo Civico Federico Eusebio (Italian for Federico Eusebio Civic Museum) is an archeology and Natural history museum in Alba, province of Cuneo, Piedmont, Italy.

== History ==
The museum was founded in 1897 as a historic and archeologic collection under the guidance of Federico Eusebio. In 1976, the museum moved to the actual site and added the natural history collections of the town.

== Collection ==
Gallery Slideshow

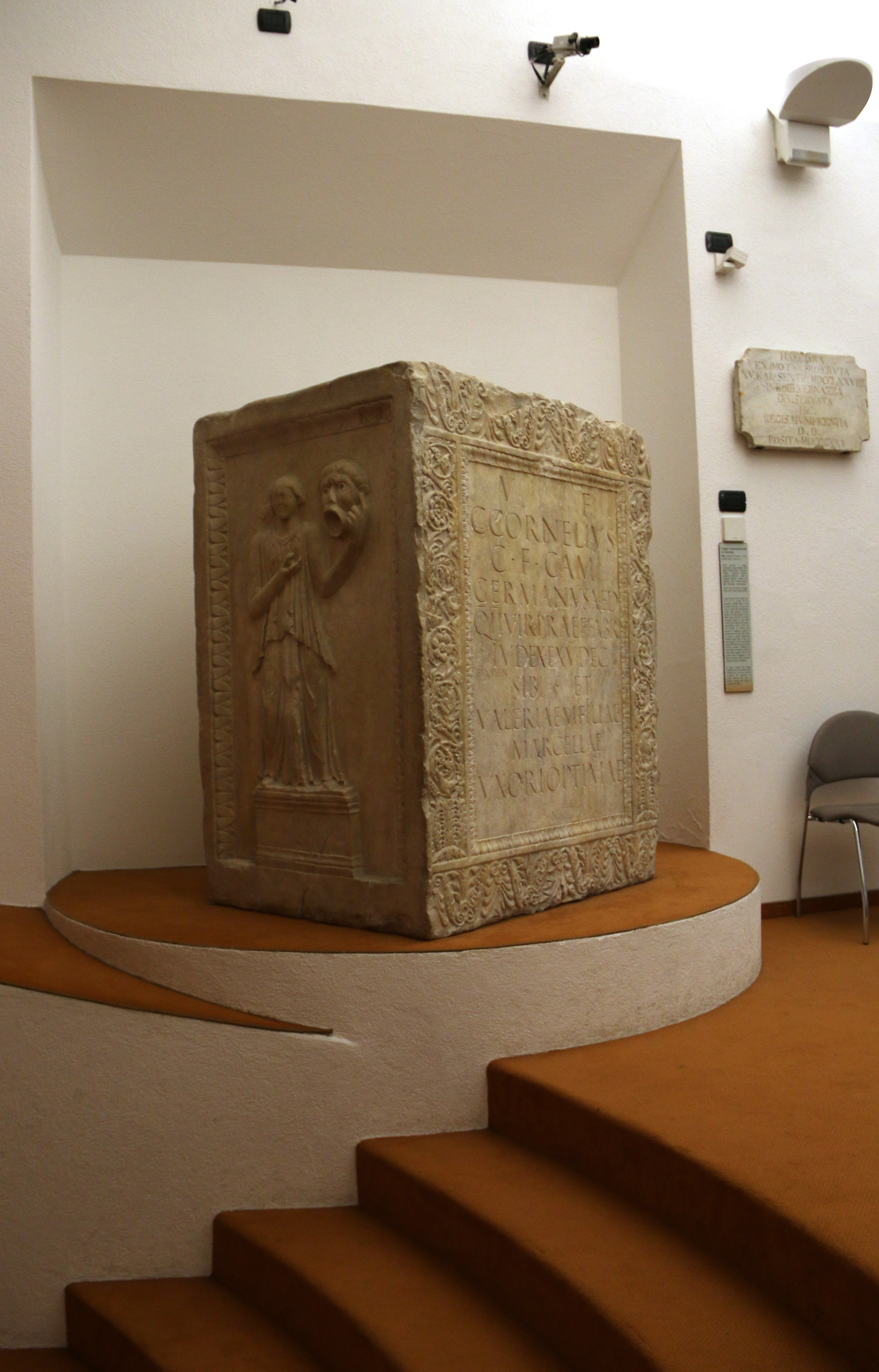
Monument (Cippus) for Caius Cornelius Germanus

Among the items on display is the finely carved marble funereal monument (1st century AD) for Caius Cornelius Germanus.
