= Rainbow: A Private Affair =

- Una questione privata
- Directed by: Paolo and Vittorio Taviani
- Screenplay by: Paolo and Vittorio Taviani
- Based on: A Private Matter by Beppe Fenoglio
- Starring: Luca Marinelli; Lorenzo Richelmy; Valentina Bellè
- Cinematography: Simone Zampagni
- Edited by: Roberto Perpignani
- Production company: Rai Cinema
- Distributed by: 01 Distribution
- Release date: 1 November 2017
- Running time: 84 minutes
- Country: Italy
- Language: Italian

Rainbow: A Private Affair (Italian: Una questione privata) is an Italian drama film directed by Paolo and Vittorio Taviani, based on the novel A Private Matter by Beppe Fenoglio. It is the last film directed by both brothers before Vittorio Taviani's death in 2018.

== Plot ==
During the fighting of the liberation war in the Langhe, the partisan Milton is divided between the fights against the Nazi-fascists, the friendship for the brigade companions and his clandestine love for Fulvia.

== Cast ==
- Luca Marinelli as Milton
- Lorenzo Richelmy as Giorgio
- Valentina Bellè as Fulvia
- Anna Ferruzzo as the custodian
- Francesca Agostini as the young peasant
- Jacopo Olmo Antinori as Jim
- Antonella Attili as Concetta
- Giulio Beranek as Ivan
- Mario Bois as the bell tower commander
- Marco Brinzi as the farmer
- Fabrizio Colica as Leone
- Mauro Conte as Paco
- Fabrizio Costella as Gilera
- Lorenzo Demaria as Radiosa Aurora
- Andrea Di Maria as the fascist prisoner
- Guglielmo Favilla as Corvo
- Francesco Turbanti as Cobra
- Giuseppe Lo Piccolo as Frank
- Vincenzo Nemolato as Commander Armellin
- Tommaso Maria Neri as Riccio
- Alessandro Sperduti as the Sheriff
- Francesco Testa as the priest
- Josafat Vagni as the fascist lieutenant

== Distribution ==
The film was shown in the Masters section of the 2017 Toronto International Film Festival on 8 September 2017 and it was released in Italy on 1 November 2017.

== Awards and nominations ==
=== Italian Golden Globes Awards (2018) ===
- Best Actor (Luca Marinelli) (ex-aequo with Toni Servillo for The Girl in the Fog)
- Nominated for Best Cinematography (Simone Zampagni)

=== Nastro d'Argento Awards (2018) ===
- Special Nastro d'Argento Award to Paolo Taviani and Tributary Award to Vittorio Taviani
