= The Life Apart =

2024 drama film

- Directed by: Marco Tullio Giordana
- Screenplay by: Marco Bellocchio; Marco Tullio Giordana; Gloria Malatesta
- Produced by: Marco Bellocchio; Simone Gattoni
- Starring: Sonia Bergamasco; Paolo Pierobon; Valentina Bellè
- Cinematography: Roberto Forza
- Edited by: Francesca Calvelli; Claudio Misantoni
- Music by: Dario Marianelli
- Release date: 22 August 2024
- Running time: 115 minutes
- Language: Italian

The Life Apart (Italian: La vita accanto) is a 2024 Italian drama film co-written and directed by Marco Tullio Giordana, starring Sonia Bergamasco and Valentina Bellè. The film was released in Italian cinemas on 22 August 2024.

== Plot ==
Vicenza, 1980. When Maria discovers she is pregnant, she happily announces her pregnancy to her husband Osvaldo. Everything goes well until the baby girl, who they will call Rebecca, is born with a large red spot on her face.

== Cast ==
- Sonia Bergamasco as Erminia Macola
- Valentina Bellè as Maria Macola
- Paolo Pierobon as Osvaldo Macola
- Beatrice Barison as Rebecca Macola

- Sara Ciocca as Rebecca Macola at 10
- Viola Basso as Rebecca Macola at 6

- Michela Cescon as Lucilla's mother
- Alessandro Bressanello as the priest
- Luigi Diberti as the doctor
- Angela Fontana as the policewoman at the airport

== Production ==
The film is based on the novel with the same name by Mariapia Veladiano. Giordana became involved in the project through screenwriter and producer Marco Bellocchio. Principal photography started in Vicenza in July 2023.

== Release ==
The film premiered out of competition at the 77th Locarno Film Festival. It was released in Italian cinemas on 22 August 2024.

== Reception ==
Matthew Joseph Jenner from International Cinephile Society gave the film a 3½ out of 5 rating, noting that "Giordana has made a film that is essentially told in tragedies and melodies, with a simple premise that touches on many complex ideas in a way that is incredibly striking. The film manages to be simultaneously sweeping in scope and intimate in emotion, which it achieves through focusing on the most raw and heart-wrenching depictions of the experiences of the protagonist and her family as they navigate the uncertain path that lies before them. This creates an unusual but undeniably moving depiction of the passage of time, as well as providing an oddly optimistic outlook".

Cineuropa's Camillo De Marco wrote: "Bellocchio's writing can definitely be gleaned in some of the film’s dramatic emphases, notably the obsession with family relations and the hypocrisies of religion. But Giordana's adaptation of the text “adjusts” the movie's approach to explore the body, human weakness and the impossibility of communicating via a film about things unsaid, which is why the choice and direction of the cast was so crucial".
