= Flag of Piedmont =

- Ël drapò (Piedmontese for "the flag")
- Use: Civil and state flag
- Proportion: 2:3
- Adopted: 24 November 1995

The flag of Piedmont is one of the official symbols of the region of Piedmont in Italy. The current flag was adopted on 24 November 1995.

Coat of arms of Piedmont

== History ==
The flag of Piedmont is essentially the arms of the Prince of Piedmont, the title for the eldest son of the King of Sardinia. When Duke Amadeus VIII of Savoy gave his eldest surviving son the title of "Prince of Piedmont" in 1424, he added a heraldic label to the coat of arms distinguish it from the general coat of arms of the House of Savoy.

Two versions exist of the Piedmontese flag: one with a blue border, and one without a blue border. The latest version, officially adopted in 1995, features a gold fringe and orange ribbon, although the flag is sometimes seen without it.

=== March of Montferrat ===

The March of Montferrat was a historical Italian state located in modern Piedmont. The flag is a simple banner of arms. The original coat of arms belonged to the Aleramici family.

=== Marquisate of Saluzzo ===
14th century–c. 1507

The Marquisate of Saluzzo was a historical Italian state that included French and Piedmont territories on the Alps. The flag is a simple banner of arms of the Del Vasto^{it} family. Del Vasto family was the side lines of the Aleramici family.

=== Principality of Masserano ===
The Principality of Masserano, linked to the Marquise of Crevacuore, was a small independent state situated in a hilly area fifteen kilometers from Biella.

==== First flag ====
1614-1701

Flag of the principality introduced around 1614, when the emperor gave a new weapon to the family of princes Ferrero-Fieschi^{it}. A square flag with six blue and white stripes, with the coat of arms in the center. The coat of arms shows a blue lion on a silver background of the Ferrero family in alternating quarters and an imperial eagle on a silver background. The striped blue and white curtain echoed the Fieschi crest.

==== Second flag ====
1701-1767

The state flag, or rather the prince's banner, appeared at the beginning of the 18th century and disappeared on 20 March 1767 with the incorporation of the principality into the Kingdom of Sardinia. The emblem in the center of the white linen is still the symbol of the reigning princes of Ferrero-Fieschi, but at the heart is a blue and silver Fieschi shield. The crown above the shield features a rising Ferrero lion.

=== Kingdom of Sardinia ===
The Kingdom of Sardinia also referred to as the Piedmont-Sardinia during the Savoyard was a state in Southern Europe from the early 14th until the mid-19th century. Despite the name of the state, the island of Sardinia itself was a marginalized region. By the time of the Crimean War in 1853, the Savoyards had built the kingdom into a strong power. There followed the annexation of other Italian states. On 17 March 1861, to more accurately reflect its new geographic extent, the Kingdom of Sardinia changed its name to the Kingdom of Italy, and its capital was eventually moved first to Florence and then to Rome. The Savoy-led Kingdom of Piedmont-Sardinia was thus the legal predecessor of the Kingdom of Italy, which in turn is the predecessor of the present-day Italian Republic.

==== First flag ====
Royal Standard of the Savoyard kings of Sardinia of Savoy dynasty (1720-1848)

Merchant Flag of the Savoyard states (18th century)

The flag of the Duchy of Savoy stabilized in the second half of the 16th century, held by the Kingdom of Sardinia (1718) and survived until the end of the 18th century. The ancient counts, later dukes of Savoy, at least in the 13th century had the coat of arms of the crusaders corresponding to the aforementioned flag, possibly imported from England. At sea, the Sardinian flag bore the letters of the Savoyard FERT motto to distinguish itself from similar flags (Malta, Denmark). The meaning of the motto is not entirely clear; perhaps it is an acronym for Foedere et Religione Tenemur, also written on ancient coins. More likely, it is an abbreviation of ferté, an archaic word meaning "fortress of the soul".

==== Second flag ====
War Ensign of the Royal Sardinian Navy (1785–1802)

Merchant Flag (1799–1802)

The nautical flag introduced in 1783/85 and replaced around 1802. It was actually a navy insignia, but was also the first obscure example of a national flag and served as a model for later flags. Blue, a dynastic colour that appeared at the end of the 14th century and may have been chosen in honor of the Mother of God (Count Amedeo VI, fighting the Turks, erected the blue insignia with the image of the Madonna). Colour was already present on some variants of the flag, such as the crusader banner with a blue border. A merchant flag, used approximately from 1799 to 1802, of the kingdom restricted to Sardinia only because of the French occupation of Piedmont.

==== Third flag ====
Merchant Flag (1802–1814)

War Ensign (1802–1814)

The nautical flags were established with other insignia in 1802, when Vittorio Emanuele I ascended the throne, and the kingdom was confined to Sardinia itself. The merchant navy version bore a previous flag in canton. The navy version had a canton loaded with an eagle with a Savoy shield on its chest. After Napoleon's fall in 1814, the king returned to Turin and on December 30 he changed the flags.

==== Fourth flag ====
Merchant Flag and War Ensign (1814–1816)

Maritime flag (merchant and war) adopted on 30 December 1814 and modified on 1 June 1816. Vittorio Emanuele, on his return to Turin, restored the canton of Savoie with a blue flag, but added the flags of Sardinia and Genoa, a new territorial acquisition.

==== Fifth flag ====
State Flag and War Ensign (1816–1848): Civil Flag "crowned"

Civil Flag and Civil Ensign (1816–1848)

War Ensign of the Kingdom of Sardinia (1816–1848) aspect ratio 31:76

National, merchant and state flag introduced by Regie Patenti on 1 June 1816. The new design of the canton, more aesthetic than the previous one, consisted of the crosses of Savoy, Genoa and Sardinia. The small royal crown on top of the innermost cross distinguished the state version from the commercial flag (raised by the state and warships, navy fortresses and consulates).

==== Sixth flag ====
State and war flag (1848–1851)

King (1848–1861) and King of Italy (1861–1880)

Crown Prince (1848–1861) and Crown Prince of the Kingdom of Italy (1861–1880)

National, state and military flag decided by Carlo Alberto, under the pressure of the events of 1848. The original Savoy's dial did not have an edge, but have been added to visually cut the coat of arms off the flag. Due to the vagueness of the decree, the flag appeared in various shapes and proportions.

==== Seventh flag ====
State flag and war ensign (1851–1861)

Civil and merchant flag (1851–1861)

National and trade flag, defined in the design and proportions (2/3) on 2 May 1851. On 17 March 1861, it became the flag of the Kingdom of Italy. The Shield of Savoy symbolized the leading role that the Kingdom of Sardinia had in the process of national unification. If it was used as a state and naval flag, the Savoy shield had to be topped with a royal crown.

=== Republic of Alba ===
1796

The flag of the Republic of Alba was designed by the jacobin Giovanni Antonio Ranza, who said that the blue and red were for France while the orange is taken to the tree of the Piedmont's shield. The orange was also the personal colour of Mr. Ranza: he fantasised his surname Ranza as a corrupted form of Italian arancia, meaning 'orange', in order to avoid the actual meaning of ranza in his own Piedmontese language, which is "scythe". The blue, red and orange flag existed in both horizontal and vertical tricolour versions, and it is used nowadays on some occasions by the region Piedmont.

=== Astese Republic ===
1797

The Astese Republic was a Jacobin commune that resulted from the political events that led to the proclamation of people's self-government in the city of Asti. According to the description, during the creation of the republic, silk flags with red inscriptions were displayed at the local church. "Freedom, Equality or Death" and "Astese Republic", in Italian LIBERTA' EGUAGLIANZA O MORTE REPUBBLICA ASTESE.

=== Republic of Ossola ===
1944

Flag of Blue Brigades

The Republic of Ossola was one of Italian Partisan Republics created during the Second World War. According to Giorgio Bocca, the republic's flag would be a tricolor red-green-blue. Green for Justice and Freedom, red for Brigate Garibaldi, blue for the monarchists. Another flag was flag used by the Blue Brigades^{it}.
