= Paolo Cerrati =

Italian lawyer and Latin poet

Paolo Cerrati (or Cerrato) (1485–1540) was a lawyer and Latin poet, best known for his long poem De Verginitate.

Born into a noble family of Alba in north-west Italy, he is said to have studied belles lettres under Dominico Rani, celebrated author of the ‘Polyantea’, and to have acquired a high reputation as a lecturer himself. In 1508 he produced a long epithalamium for the marriage of William IX, Marquis of Montferrat and Anne d’Alençon. Having graduated in civil and canon law in 1511 he became a lawyer in his home town, where he also devoted his energies to the city's administration and that of its hospital. De Verginitate, seen as the most important of his many writings in the Latin language, was published in three volumes in 1524 in Paris. When this, and others of his works, were published by Giuseppe Vernazza in 1778, they were described by The London Review of English and Foreign Literature as being ‘of the heroic, epigrammatic, and erotic kind, written with great elegance and purity’.
