= Valentina Bellè =

Italian actress (born 1992)

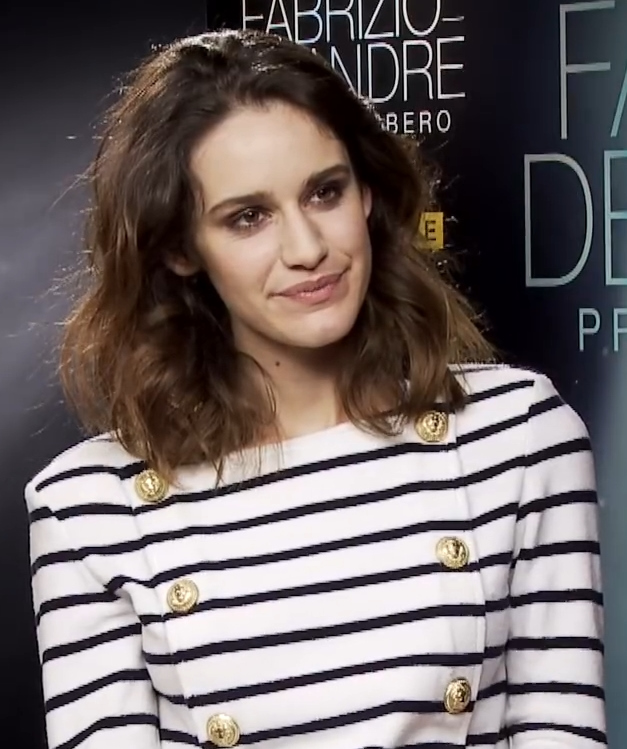
- Bellè in 2018
- Born: 16 April 1992 (age 34); Verona, Italy
- Occupation: Actress
- Years active: 2010–present

Valentina Bellè (born 16 April 1992) is an Italian actress.

== Biography ==
Born in Verona from an Italian father and a German mother, as a child she showed interest in art and studied acting. After finishing high school, Valentina worked as a model, taking part in fashion shows and photo shoots.

In 2012, at the age of 19, she spent four months in New York City and attended the Lee Strasberg Theatre and Film Institute to undertake acting classes. In 2013, Bellè tried to enter the Centro Sperimentale di Cinematografia in Rome, where she was refused. From there, she left for London to learn English and at the Royal Academy of Dramatic Art, but received a call from the CSC from Rome: one of the girls accepted at the Centro Sperimentale had refused the seat, so Valentina took her place.

Upon graduation from the CSC, she received her first and most important television role as Lucrezia Tornabuoni in the TV series Medici: Masters of Florence. She became well-known on the silver screen for her performances in movies like Wondrous Boccaccio and Rainbow: A Private Affair, both directed by the Taviani brothers.

In 2018, she took part on the TV series Genius, where she played the role of Jacqueline Roque, last wife of Pablo Picasso, portrayed by Antonio Banderas.

== Filmography ==
=== Films ===
Year	Title	Role(s)	Notes
2014	La buca	Arianna	
2014	La vita oscena	Kissing girl	Cameo appearance
2015	Wondrous Boccaccio	Emilia's sister	
2017	Il permesso - 48 ore fuori	Rossana Isimbardi	
2017	Rainbow: A Private Affair	Fulvia	
2017	Stories of Love That Cannot Belong to This World	Nina	
2018	Fabrizio De André: Spirito libero	Dori Ghezzi	
2019	Dolceroma	Jaccaranda Ponti	
2019	Into the Labyrinth	Mila Vasquez	
2021	Baggio: The Divine Ponytail	Andreina	
2021	Love Gets a Room	Ada	
2022	Miranda's Mind	Miranda Alanmade	Short film
2023	Ferrari	Cecilia Manzini	
2024	The Life Apart	Maria Macola	

=== Television ===
Year	Title	Role(s)	Notes
2015	Caccia al Re - La narcotici	Arianna Carrocci	Main role (season 2); 6 episodes
2015	Grand Hotel	Adele Alibrandi	Miniseries
2016	Medici	Lucrezia Tornabuoni	Main role (season 1); 8 episodes
2017	Sirene	Yara	Lead role; 8 episodes
2018	Genius	Jacqueline Roque	2 episodes
2019	Catch-22	Clara	Recurring role; 3 episodes
2019–present	Volevo fare la rockstar	Olivia	Lead role
2022	Romulus	Ersilia	Main role (season 2); 8 episodes
2023	The Good Mothers	Giuseppina Pesce	Main role; 4 episodes
2025	Public Disorder	Marta Sarri	Main role; 6 episodes

== Awards and nominations ==
Year	Award	Category	Work	Result	Ref.
2017	Fabrique du Cinéma Awards	Best Actress	Rainbow: A Private Affair	Won	
2023	Nastri d'Argento Grandi Serie	Best Supporting Actress	The Good Mothers	Won	
