= Flag of Hungary =

Hungary
- Piros-fehér-zöld ('Red-white-green')
- Use: Civil and state flag
- Proportion: 1:2
- Adopted: 1848 (original design); 23 May 1957 (as state flag); 19 June 1990 (reaffirmed)
- Design: A equal blank horizontal tricolour of red, white and green
- Use: Civil flag and ensign
- Proportion: 2:3
- Adopted: 1848 (original design); 18 August 1957 (as civil ensign)
- Design: A equal blank horizontal tricolour of red, white and green
- Use: Unofficial state flag (Note: The official Hungarian state flag does not contain the Hungarian coat of arms, but the variant defaced with the coat of arms is often used during solemn occasions.)
- Proportion: 1:2
- Adopted: 10 October 1995
- Design: A equal horizontal tricolour of red, white and green with the state coat of arms in the centre.
- Use: Unit colour
- Proportion: 6:7
- Adopted: 15 March 1991
- Use: Naval ensign
- Proportion: 3:4
- Adopted: 1991

The national flag of Hungary, also known as the Red-White-Green (Hungarian: piros-fehér-zöld), is an equal horizontal tricolour of red, white and green. In this exact form, it has been the official flag of Hungary since 23 May 1957. The flag's form originates from national republican movements of the 18th and 19th centuries, while its colours are from the Middle Ages. The current Hungarian flag is similar to the 1816 version of the British republican tricolour, differing only in the shades used. The colours in that form were also already used since at least the coronation of Leopold II in 1790, predating the first use of the Cispadane Republic's tricolour in 1797. Following the removal of the coat of arms in 1957, it became one of only three flags of a socialist state in Europe to not incorporate socialist symbolism, alongside the Polish and Czechoslovak flags.

== History ==
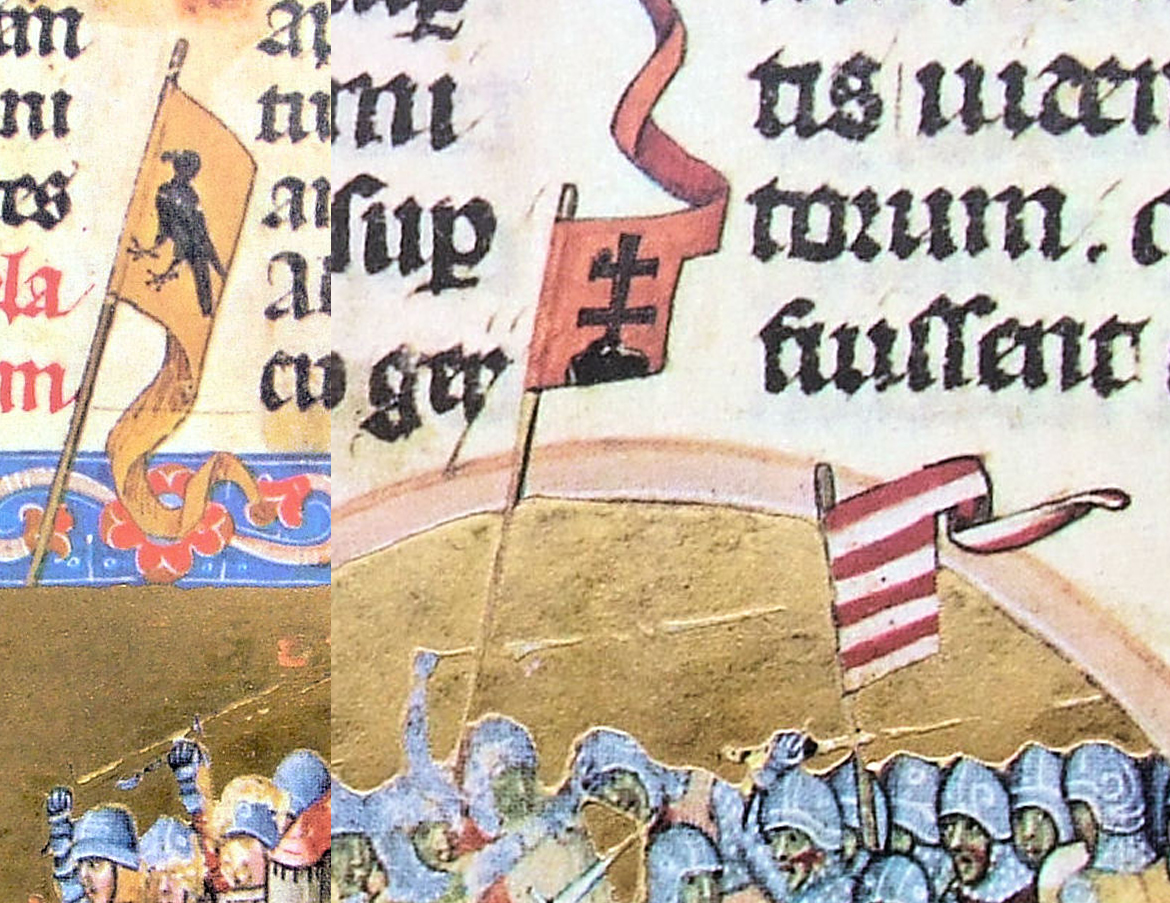
Flags of Hungarians in the Chronicon Pictum: Turul, Double cross, Árpád stripes

According to medieval Hungarian chronicles, early Hungarian warriors fought under red banners adorned with a black Turul bird, a mythological creature associated with Hungarian origin legends. These early military standards were later replaced by flags embroidered with images of Christian saints. For instance, King Saint Stephen of Hungary is said to have gone into battle "under the banner of Saint George and Saint Martin." In the later medieval period, the flag of the Hungarian royal House of Árpád, the Árpád stripes, the red and silver striped flag became increasingly common, occasionally supplemented by the dynastic colors of the reigning royal house.

Since the 15th century onwards, the combination of red, white, and green began to appear more frequently, particularly as twisted silk cords on official document seals, and sometimes as decorative elements on the edges of military banners. However, it was not until 1806 that the red-white-green color scheme was formally described in the order recognized today. The official adoption of these colors was established by Act XXI of 1848, which for the first time mandated the use of the "red-white-green" tricolor flag as a national symbol of Hungary.

== Current flag ==
The modern flag of Hungary originated from the national freedom movement from before 1848, which culminated in the Hungarian Revolution of 1848. The revolution was not only in opposition against the monarchy but also the Habsburg Empire, as well as to form an independent republic. Accordingly, the modern flag of Hungary features a tricolour element based on the flag of France as a reflection of the ideas of the French Revolution of 1848 (with changing the vertical pattern into horizontal); while the red, white, and green colours are derived from the historical Hungarian coat of arms, which have essentially remained in the same form since the mid-15th century, with exception to some minor differences, and were marshalled from arms that first appeared in the late 12th and early 13th century as arms of the Árpáds, Hungary's founding dynasty. The stripes are horizontal rather than vertical to prevent confusion with the Italian flag despite the banner in that form predating the Italian tricolour by at least 7 years but unlike in Italy, the Italians adopted it as the flag of an Italian state in 1797. According to other data, but no evidence of, the recent form of the Hungarian tricolour had been already used from 1608 at the coronation of Mathias II of Hungary and following coronations. Folklore of the romantic period attributed the colours to virtues: red for strength, white for faithfulness and green for hope. Alternatively, red for the blood spilled for the fatherland, white for freedom and green for the land, for the pastures of Hungary. The new constitution, which took effect on 1 January 2012, makes the ex-post interpretation mentioned first official (in the semi-official translation: strength (erő), fidelity (hűség) and hope (remény)).

=== Evolution ===
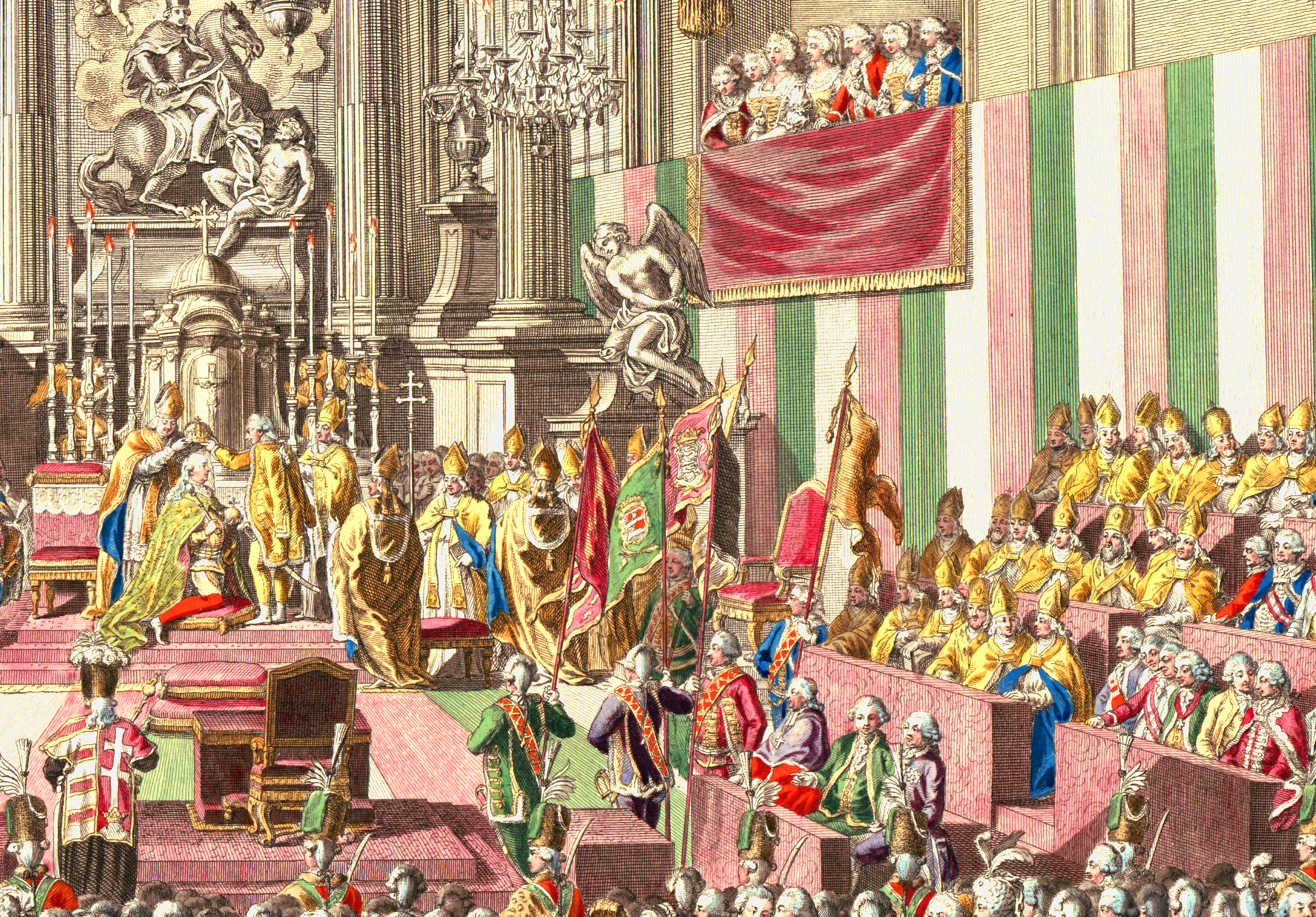
Hungarian national colours on the wall, Hungarian coronation of Leopold II in Pressburg (Pozsony, today's Bratislava) in 1790, 58 years before the 1848 Hungarian revolution

As described above, the red, white and green tricolour clearly emerged as a sign of national sovereignty during the 1848–1849 revolution against the Habsburgs. Hungarian volunteers and Émigrés fought for the social movement and wars of Italian unification under the banner for Garibaldi. After the revolution in Hungary was defeated, the tricolour flag was prohibited by the Austrian Emperor. After the Compromise of 1867, however, the tricolour became not only legal, but also the official flag of Hungary. The flag had the so-called minor arms (also known as the Kossuth coat of arms) of Hungary with archangels as supporters were used as a badge on the flag. This configuration was used until the end of the Habsburg Empire in 1918.

After the fall of the Habsburg Empire, the years 1918 to 1920 were highly turbulent, and several hard-to-trace minor changes took place. The red-white-green tricolour stayed the same, but small differences emerged in terms of the badge. A short interlude and exception was the 1919 Hungarian Soviet Republic, which lasted for four-and-a-half months; it used a solid red banner.

It seems that from 1920 to 1944–1945 the tricolour displayed the minor arms of Hungary, but the version without them was also used.

Between 1946 and 1949 the crown was removed from the top of the arms serving as the badge.

With the onset of Communist rule in 1949, a new coat of arms featuring a Communist red star was placed on the flag as the badge.

During the anti-Soviet uprising in 1956, revolutionaries cut out the Hammer and Wheat emblem and used the resulting tricolour with a hole in the middle as the symbol of the revolution. For some months the new government changed the flag to bear the minor arms without the crown as the badge again.

In 1957, after the revolution was defeated by the Soviet Red Army, the new government created a "new" coat of arms, which however was never officially put onto the flag. Therefore, the official flag of Hungary has been a pure red-white-green tricolour since 1957.

After the fall of communism in 1989 there was no need to change the flag, as like the flags of Poland and Czechoslovakia, it did not bear any communist insignia.

There was a recommendation of the Committee of Symbols in the 2000s, that the coat of arms should be part of the state flag, while the national flag should remain plain (as is the status quo). This has not been implemented in law, though in case of most state use the arms are legally permitted on the flag (see below).

=== Exact description and legislature ===
The Hungarian Constitution does not explicitly state anything about the width:length ratio of the flag; but, there is a law from 1957 that is in force stating that seagoing merchant vessels shall hoist the red, white and green tricolour in 2:3 ratio.

By a government decree from 2000, the ratio (which is neither defined in the Constitution nor in 1995 or 2000 legislation) of flags used on government building is 1:2.

Summarized, this would mean:

- A red–white–green tricolour. Actually many variations might be used though according to 1995/LXXXIII §11 (3) "(3) In cases specified in paragraphs (1) and (2), the arms and the flag can be used also in their historical forms.", as (1) reads as: 1995/LXXXIII §11 (1) "(1) For the purpose of declaring their belonging to the nation, private persons can use the arms and the flag, subject to the limitations in this law."
- red–white–green tricolour, ratio 1:2 (by decree from 2000). According to 1995/LXXXIII §11 (4), the official coat of arms of Hungary might be placed onto it as a badge.
- White background with green red alternated flammulette ("flame tongues", triangles with wavy edge) border, coat of arms in the center, embraced by oak branches from the left, olive branches from the right. Ratio not defined. ( 1995/LXXXIII §8 (1) )
- 2:3 (ratio defined by 1957 law) red-white-green tricolour (there is a merchant fleet)
- Unknown or unspecified;
- White background with green red alternated triangle border, coat of arms at 1/3 of the flag, nearer to the pole. Ratio not defined. ( 1995/LXXXIII §8 (2) )

== Colors ==
The colours of the flag of Hungary are defined in Hungarian Standard MSZ 1361:2009:

Colour scheme	Crimson red	White	Teal green
Pantone	18-1660 TCX Tomato	Not available	18-6320 TCX Fairway
CIELAB	44.0, 60.0, 32.0	100.0, 128.0, 128.0	37.5, 26.0, 144.0
RGB	206, 41, 57	255, 255, 255	71, 112, 80
Hexadecimal	#CE2939	#FFFFFF	#477050

== Gallery ==
Unofficial civil flag of Hungary

Unofficial state flag of Hungary

State flag of Hungary (vertical version)

Unofficial state flag of Hungary (vertical version)

=== Historical flags ===
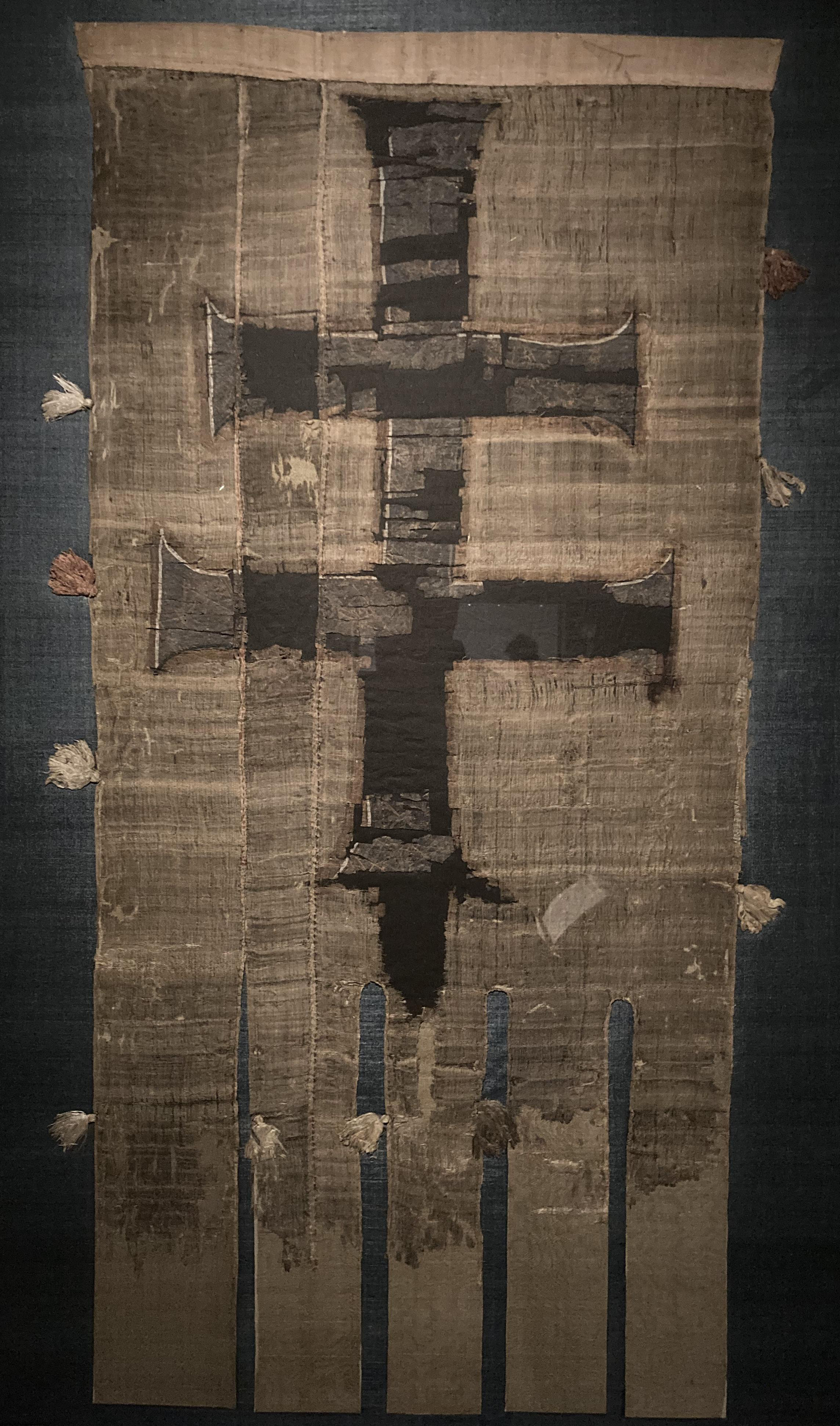
Hungarian flag from Königsfelden Monastery from the first half of the 14th century, from the monastery of Agnes of Habsburg, widow of King Andrew III of Hungary (1290–1301)
Flag of the Principality of Hungary (895–1000)

Royal Standard of Hungary under the rule of Béla III (1172–1196)

Royal Standard of the Kingdom of Hungary in the 13th century

Standard of the Árpád dynasty in the 13th century

Royal Standard of the Kingdom of Hungary under the Angevin dynasty from 1301 to 1382

Royal Standard of Hungary under the rule of Sigismund (1387–1437)

Royal Standard of Hungary under the rule of Vladislaus I (1440–1444)

Hungarian banner on battle images according to the Chronica Hungarorum

Royal Standard of Hungary under the rule of Matthias I (1458–1490)

Royal Standard of Hungary under the rule of Matthias I (1458–1490)

Royal Standard of Hungary under the rule of Vladislaus II (1490–1516)

Royal Standard attributed to Louis II of Hungary (1516–1526)

Flag of the Kingdom of Hungary as part of the Habsburg monarchy and the Austrian Empire from the 18th century to 1848

Flag raised during Rákóczi's War of Independence (1703–1711)

Flag of the Hungarian State

Flag of the Kingdom of Hungary, used in Hungarian Revolution of 1848

Flag of the Kingdom of Hungary, used between 1848 and 1849 and again between 1867 and 1869

Flag of the Kingdom of Hungary as part of the Habsburg monarchy and the Austrian Empire from 1848 to 1867

Flag of the Kingdom of Hungary, used between 1867 and 1869

Flag of the Kingdom of Hungary from 1869 to 1874 with the Hungarian small coat of arms

Flag of the Kingdom of Hungary from 1874 to 1896

Flag of the Kingdom of Hungary from 1896 to 1915

A variant of the flag of Hungary, used between 1896 and 1915, while part of Austria-Hungary

Flag of the Kingdom of Hungary from 1915 to 1918

A variant of the flag of Hungary used between 1915 and 1918

Flag of the short-lived Hungarian People's Republic, used between 1918–1919 under the rule of Károlyi

Flag of the Hungarian Soviet Republic, used briefly in 1919

Flag of Hungary, used between 1919 and 1946 with the Hungarian small coat of arms

Flag of Hungary, used between 1946 and 1949 and between 1956 and 1957 with the Kossuth coat of arms

Flag of the Hungarian People's Republic, used between 1949 and 1956, bearing the Communist Rákosi coat of arms

This flag, from which the Rákosi era coat of arms has been cut out, became the symbol of the Hungarian Revolution of 1956.

Government ensign of Hungary, used between 1957 and 1990

Flag of Hungary, used from 1957 to the present

=== Head of state standards ===
Ensign of the Regent, used between 1921 and 1939

Standard of the Regent as supreme warlord of the Royal Hungarian Army, used between 1939 and 1944

Ensign of the President, used between 1948 and 1950

Standard of the President, used between 1990 and 2012

Standard of the President, used from 2012

== See also ==
- List of Hungarian flags
- Flags of Hungarian history
- Coat of arms of Hungary
- Himnusz
