= Republic of Alba (1944) =

Former state in Italy

Coordinates: 44°42′N 8°02′E

Republic of Alba Repubblica di Alba
- 1944
- Flag
- Status: Unrecognized state
- Capital: Alba
- Common languages: Italian
- Government: Partisan republic
- Historical era: World War II
  - Established: 10 October 1944
  - Conquered: 2 November 1944
- Currency: Italian lira
Preceded by	Succeeded by
Italian Social Republic	Italian Social Republic

The Republic of Alba was a short-lived state that existed from 10 October to 2 November 1944 in Alba, northern Italy, as a local resistance against Italian fascism during World War II, and which was part of the so-called Italian Partisan Republics, the first of which was the Republic of Corniolo. It was named after the Napoleonic Republic of Alba that existed in 1796 in Piedmont.

== Occupation of Alba ==
On 10 October 1944, c. 2000 partisans occupied the city almost without conflict since the fascist contingents under Ippolito Radaelli had abandoned the city following negotiations with the partisans mediated by the Curia. The partisans were mostly from Alpini divisions led by Enrico Martini.

== The partisan government ==
Command of the city was assumed by Carletto Morelli, while the civil administration continued under chosen local officials.

== The fascist counterattack ==

Fascist troops gathered at Bra and Pollenzo with reinforcements from Turin. They attempted to ford the Tanaro after 24 October but were repulsed, suffering 11 casualties including their commanding officer.

== Quotes ==
Alba was conquered by two thousand people on the 10th of October
and two hundred lost it on the 2nd of November
of the year 1944

— Beppe Fenoglio, The Twenty-three Days of the City of Alba

== See also ==
- Italian Partisan Republics
- Italian resistance movement
