= Alba, Piedmont =

Town in Piedmont, Italy

Alba Arba (Piedmontese)
- Comune
- Comune di Alba
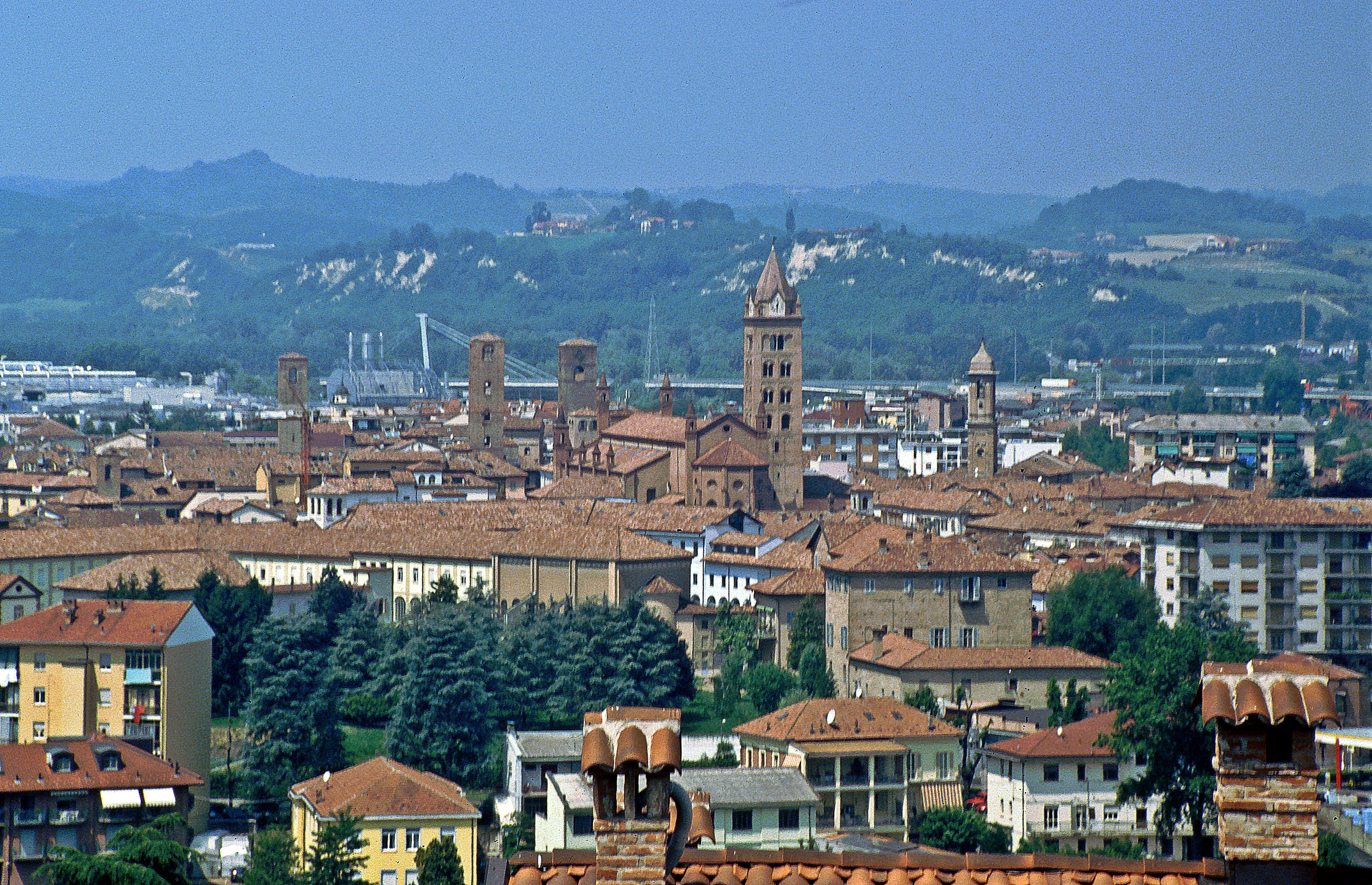
- View of the city of Alba

- Coat of arms

- Location of Alba in Italy Alba (Piedmont)
- Coordinates: 44°42′N 08°02′E
- Country: Italy
- Region: Piedmont
- Province: Cuneo (CN)
- Frazioni: Belmonte, Biglini, Camairana, Gallo, Ghiglini, Luisetto, Magliano, Mussotto, Prandi II, Ricca-San Rocco Cherasca, Rubbo, San Rocco Seno D'Elvio, Scaparone

Government
  - Mayor: Alberto Gatto

Area
  - Total: 53.59 km^{2} (20.69 sq mi)
- Elevation: 172 m (564 ft)

Population (1 January 2021)
  - Total: 31,215
  - Density: 582.5/km^{2} (1,509/sq mi)
- Demonym: Albese(i)
- Time zone: UTC+1 (CET)
  - Summer (DST): UTC+2 (CEST)
- Postal code: 12051
- Dialing code: 173
- Patron saint: St. Lawrence
- Saint day: 10 August
- Website: Official website

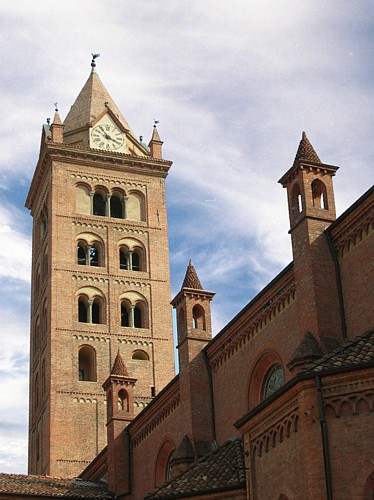
The Cathedral of Alba.

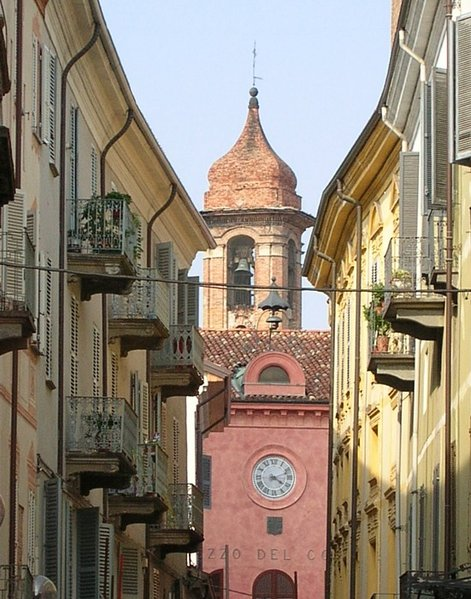
A view of Via Vittorio Emanuele in the center of Alba.

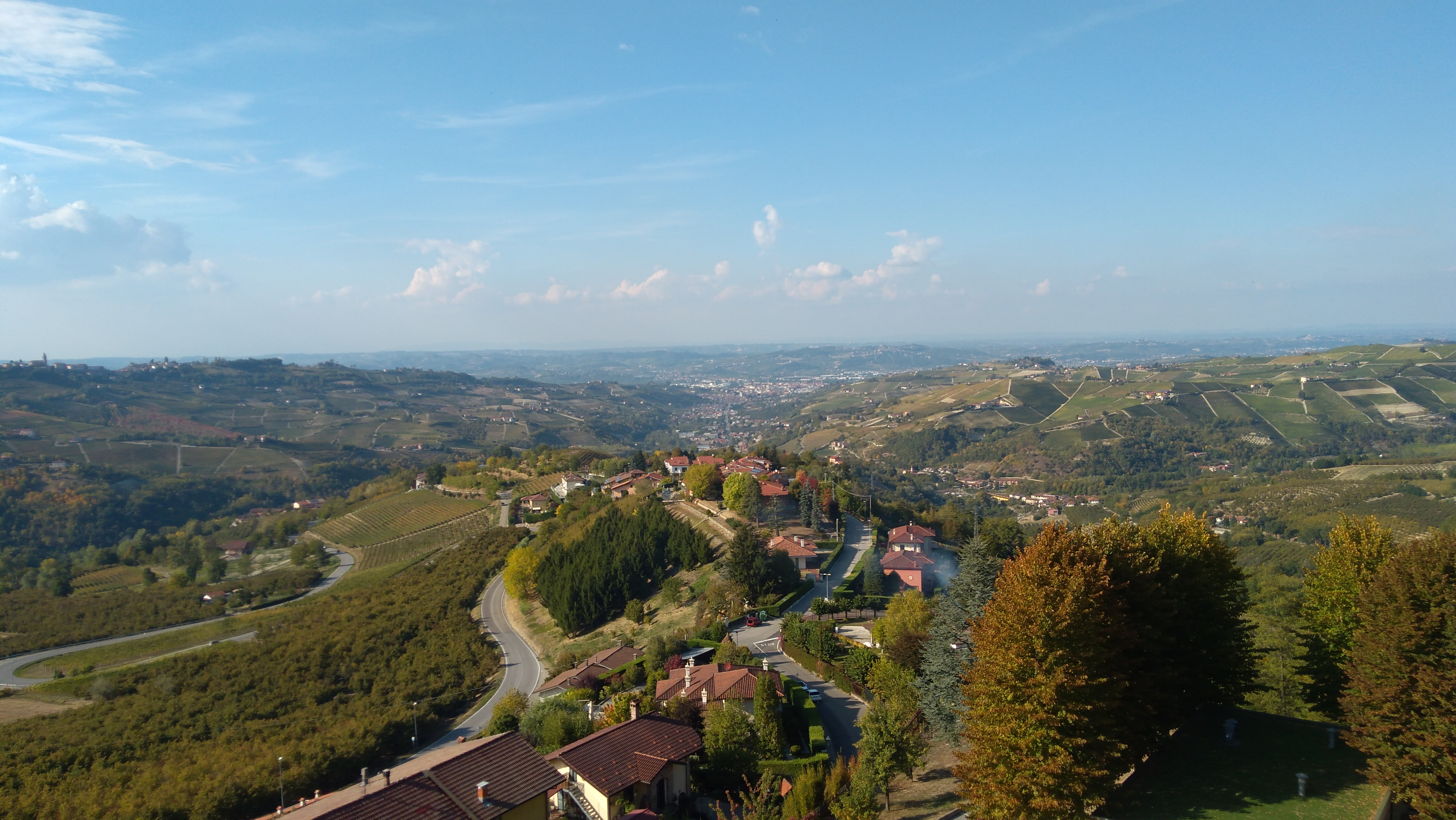
View over Alba in the distance from Rodello's hilltop.

Alba (Piedmontese: Arba; Latin: Alba Pompeia) is a town and comune of Piedmont, Italy, in the Province of Cuneo. It is one of the main cities in the UNESCO World Heritage Site of Vineyard Landscape of Piedmont: Langhe-Roero and Monferrato. The town is famous for its white truffle and wine production. The confectionery group Ferrero is based there. The city joined the UNESCO Creative Cities Network in October 2017.

== History ==
Alba's origins date from before the Roman civilization, connected probably to the presence of Celtic and Ligurian tribes in the area. The modern town occupies the site of ancient Alba Pompeia, the name given after being officially recognized as a town by the Roman consul Gnaeus Pompeius Strabo while constructing a road from Aquae Statiellae (Acqui) to Augusta Taurinorum (Turin). Alba was the birthplace of Publius Helvius Pertinax, briefly Roman emperor in 193.

After the fall of the Western Empire, the city was repeatedly sacked by Ostrogoths, Burgundians, Byzantines, Lombards, Franks, Hungarians and Saracens. In the 11th century it became a free commune (or city-state) and was a member of the Lombard League. Montferrat and the Visconti fought over the town; later it became a possession of the Gonzaga. Charles Emmanuel I of Savoy conquered it twice, while later France and Spain battled for its possession. The Treaty of Cherasco (1631) assigned Alba definitively to Savoy. During Napoleonic Wars, it was part of the Republic of Alba (1796) and of the Subalpine Republic, both French clients, before being annexed to the French Empire in 1802. It was an arrondissement center in firstly Tanaro department between 1802 and 1805, later in Stura one between 1805 and 1814 before liberation by Austrian troops. It was returned to the Kingdom of Sardinia (Duchy of Savoy's name after gaining Sardinia in 1720) in 1814.

Alba won a Gold Medal for Military Valour for the heroic activity of its citizens in the Italian resistance movement during the course of World War II. On 10 October 1944, the town was liberated by partisans who established a Republic of Alba which for a few weeks was able to maintain its independence from the Fascist Republic of Salò. The republic lasted until 2 November 1944, when the Republic of Salo retook it. French troops finally liberated it on 2 May 1945.

== Geography ==
Approximately located at about 50 km from the cities of Turin and Cuneo, Alba is placed on the right side of the river Tanaro. The climate is typically drier than in other lands at the north of the Po river.

== Main sights ==
Of the Roman city, which had a polygonal form, parts of the fortified gate and remains of some edifices with marble and mosaics can still be seen. Other attractions include:

- Palazzo Comunale (13th century): city hall housing a Nativity (1501) by Macrino d'Alba.
- City towers (14th and 15th centuries): Alba was once known as the "City with hundred towers".
- Duomo of San Lorenzo (12th-century): Roman Catholic cathedral built in Romanesque style, probably atop an Ancient Roman temple. It was restructured multiple times over the centuries, starting in the 15th century in a reconstruction patronized by bishop Andrea Novelli. The current appearance derives from a controversial 19th-century restoration; however, the three portals and the crypt remain from the original edifice. The church is well known for its wood-carved choir made in 1512 by Bernardino Fossati. The current belfry, from the 12th century, includes the original bell tower entirely.
- San Domenico (13th-14th centuries): Gothic architecture church housing much of the most salient sacred artworks in town. It has a noteworthy portal with a triple arch within a pointed arch, a polygonal apse, and traces of Renaissance frescoes. During the Napoleonic Wars it was used a stable, but reconsecrated on 22 June 1827.
- St John the Baptist (San Giovanni Battista): Baroque architecture church housing a Madonna of the Graces (1377) by Barnaba da Modena and a Madonna with Saints (1508) by Macrino d'Alba.
- Santa Maria Maddalena (late-18th century): small late-Baroque church designed by Bernardo Antonio Vittone and housing the relics of Blessed Margaret of Savoy.

The city museums include the Federico Eusebio Civic Museum of Archaeology and Natural Sciences.

== Economy ==
In addition to traditional agriculture, Alba is a very important center of wine. In the area of Alba, in fact, there are 290 wineries that cultivate an area of 700 hectares (1,700 acres) of land, producing an average of 61,200 hL of wine annually. The wines of Alba are among the most renowned in Italy and are divided into:

- DOC: Barbera, Dolcetto, Nebbiolo.
- DOCG: Barbaresco, Barolo, Moscato.

The city has a thriving economy, boasting the confectionery industry's world-renowned Ferrero, the publishing house Società San Paolo and the textile firm Miroglio. The town also houses the largest cooperative credit bank of Italy, by number of partners, the Banca d'Alba, and the international food chain Eataly. UniEuro, the Italian chain of stores specializing in household electrical appliances and acquired by Dixons Retail in 2002, was also established in Alba. Alba is also famous worldwide for its white truffles, and its annual Truffle Festival.

== Climate ==
According to the Köppen climate classification, Alba has a humid subtropical climate which is moderated by the proximity of the Mediterranean sea. Its winters are warmer, January is usually 5 °C (41 °F), and its summers are hot, when temperatures can reach 35 °C (95 °F). Rain falls mostly during the spring and autumn; during the hottest months rain is less common, July with 43 mm (2 in) and August with 51 mm (2 in). During November and December, the town of Alba can be prone to fog.

Climate data for Alba
Month	Jan	Feb	Mar	Apr	May	Jun	Jul	Aug	Sep	Oct	Nov	Dec	Year
Mean daily maximum °C (°F)	5.2 (41.4)	8.0 (46.4)	13.6 (56.5)	18.0 (64.4)	22.8 (73.0)	26.6 (79.9)	28.8 (83.8)	27.4 (81.3)	23.6 (74.5)	18.2 (64.8)	11.8 (53.2)	6.4 (43.5)	17.5 (63.6)
Daily mean °C (°F)	1.6 (34.9)	3.6 (38.5)	8.6 (47.5)	12.9 (55.2)	17.2 (63.0)	21.3 (70.3)	23.2 (73.8)	22.1 (71.8)	18.6 (65.5)	13.5 (56.3)	8.2 (46.8)	3.0 (37.4)	12.8 (55.1)
Mean daily minimum °C (°F)	−2.0 (28.4)	−0.8 (30.6)	3.6 (38.5)	7.8 (46.0)	11.6 (52.9)	16.0 (60.8)	17.6 (63.7)	16.8 (62.2)	13.6 (56.5)	8.9 (48.0)	4.6 (40.3)	−0.3 (31.5)	8.1 (46.6)
Average rainfall mm (inches)	53 (2.1)	51 (2.0)	86 (3.4)	113 (4.4)	124 (4.9)	87 (3.4)	43 (1.7)	51 (2.0)	76 (3.0)	107 (4.2)	93 (3.7)	64 (2.5)	948 (37.3)

== Sport ==
The town's football club Albese has been in existence since 1917.

== Notable natives and residents ==
- Publius Helvius Pertinax (126–193), Governor of Britain c. 185–187 and Roman Emperor for the first 86 days of 193 AD was born in Alba.
- The Blessed Margaret of Savoy (1390–1464), child bride and childless, youthful widow of Theodore II, Marquess of Montferrat established, ruled over, and was interred in a monastery here.
- Paolo Cerrati or Cerrato (1485–1540), lawyer and Latin poet
- Macrino d'Alba (c. 1460–65 – c. 1510–20) was a Renaissance painter, born in Alba and largely active in northwest Italy.
- Giuseppe "Pinot" Gallizio (1912–1964), an artist born in Alba and co-founder thereof the International Movement for an Imaginist Bauhaus.
- Beppe Fenoglio (1922–1963) was a writer born in Alba and a (royalist) partisan fighter who participated in the brief liberation of the town from Nazi-Fascist control in 1944.
- Sara Bonifacio (born 1996), Italian female volleyball player.

== Twin towns – sister cities ==
Alba is twinned with:

- Arlon, Belgium (2004)
- Banská Bystrica, Slovakia (1967)
- Beausoleil, France
- Böblingen, Germany
- Giresun, Turkey (2017)
- Medford, Oregon, United States (1960)
- Sant Cugat del Vallès, Spain

== See also ==
- Republic of Alba (1796–1810)
- Republic of Alba (1944)
- Roman Catholic Diocese of Alba Pompeia
- Piemonte (wine)
- Nutella

== Sources and external links ==
- www.comune.alba.cn.it (in Italian) – the official website of the city council
- Alba Music Festival, artistic direction: Giuseppe Nova, Jeff Silberschlag, Larry Vote
- Guide to Alba city – Information, phone numbers and useful links at comuni-italiani.it
- Information on Alba – a very short tourist guide from www.piemonte-Italy.info
- Coro Giovanile La Schola (in Italian) – the website of the “La Schola” youth choir of the cathedral parish of Alba
- Diocese of Alba Pompeia – article from the Old Catholic Encyclopedia of 1913
