= Beppe Fenoglio =

Italian writer, partisan and translator (1922–1963)

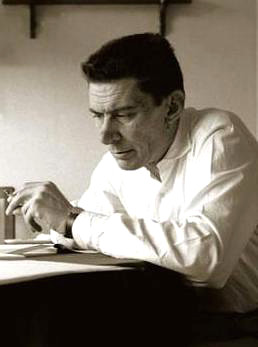
- Born: Giuseppe Fenoglio; 1 March 1922; Alba, Kingdom of Italy
- Died: 18 February 1963 (aged 40); Turin, Italy
- Writing career
- Language: Italian
- Notable work: Il partigiano Johnny

Giuseppe "Beppe" Fenoglio (Italian pronunciation: [ˈbɛppe feˈnɔʎʎo]; 1 March 1922 – 18 February 1963) was an Italian writer, partisan and translator from English. The works of Fenoglio have two main themes: the rural world of the Langhe, where he was born and raised, and the Italian resistance movement, both largely inspired by his own personal experiences in them; equally, the writer has two styles: the chronicle and the epos.

Fenoglio was drafted in 1943; before he completed officer school, Italy surrendered to the Allies and Germany attacked and occupied most of Italy. Like most of Italian Army, the training unit of Fenoglio collapsed; he adventurously travelled back home from Rome and spent months in hiding before joining the partisans in January 1944. After fighting till the end of the war, he translated a number of books from English and wrote the works he is known for while working for a winery in Alba. His first work was in the neorealist style: La paga del sabato (this was published posthumously too, in 1969). The novel was turned down by Elio Vittorini, who advised Fenoglio to carve out stories and then incorporate them into I ventitré giorni della città di Alba (The twenty-three days of the city of Alba, 1952).

These stories were a chronicle of the Italian partisans or of rural life. One such story was La malora (1954), a long story in the style of Giovanni Verga. His major works were published in a critical edition after his death; controversy remains about his novel Il partigiano Johnny (translated as Johnny the Partisan), first published in 1968, by some considered his best work, which was edited posthumously based on one or both of the two incomplete versions left unpublished. Fenoglio died in Turin, aged 40, of bronchial cancer.

== Works ==
- L'affare dell'anima e altri racconti
- Appunti partigiani : '44-'45
- Una crociera agli antipodi e altri racconti fantastici
- Un giorno di fuoco
- L'imboscata
- Lettere : 1940-1962
- La paga del sabato
- La voce nella tempesta (theatre drama from Wuthering Heights)
- Il partigiano Johnny. Translated as "Johnny the Partisan", 1995.
- La malora Translated as "Ruin", 1995.
- Primavera di bellezza : romanzo
- Una questione privata. Translated as "A Private Matter", 1988 and "A Private Affair", 2006.
- I ventitré giorni della città di Alba. Translated as "The Twenty-three Days of the City of Alba", 2002.
