= Royal Palace of Naples =

Historic building in Naples, Italy

- Palazzo Reale di Napoli (Italian); Palazzo Riale 'e Napule (Neapolitan)
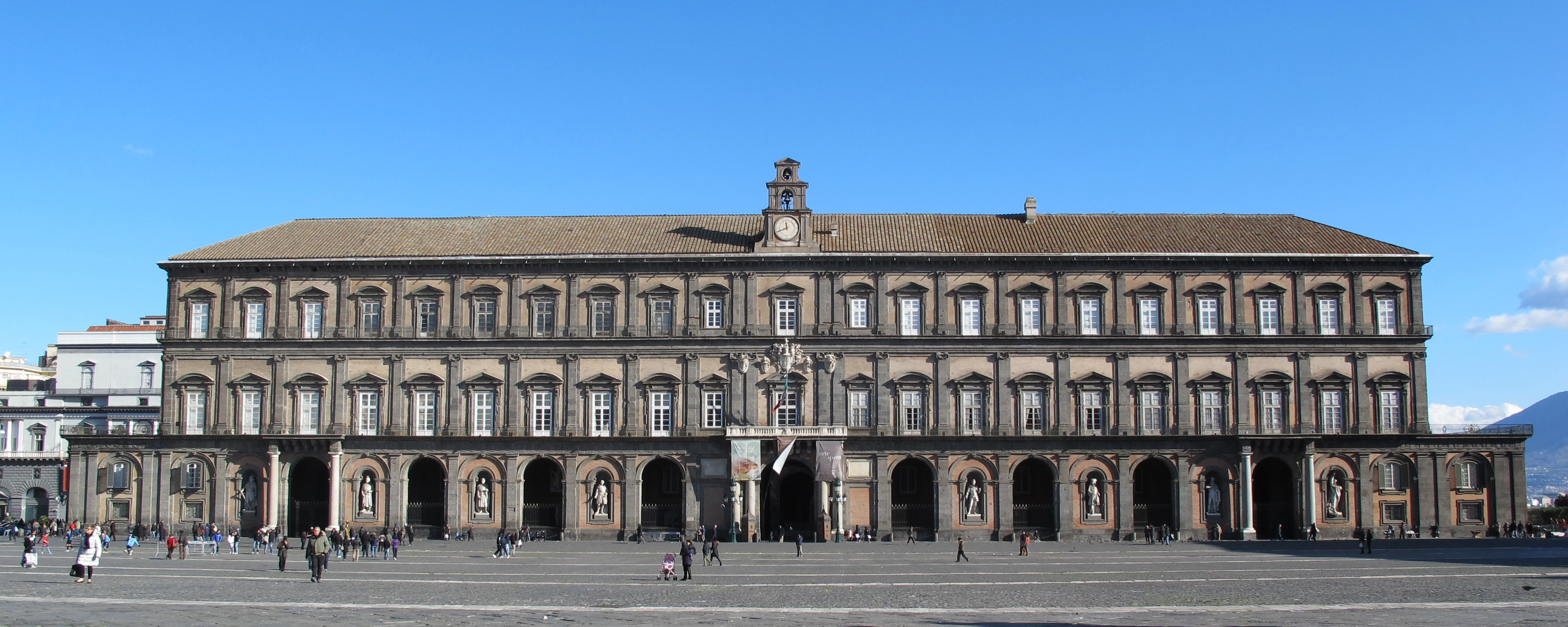
- Royal Palace façade
- Interactive map of the Royal Palace of Naples area

General information
- Type: Palace
- Architectural style: Italian Baroque, Neo-Classical
- Location: Naples, Italy, Piazza del Plebiscito 1
- Coordinates: 40°50′10″N 14°14′59″E

Website
- palazzorealedinapoli.org

The Royal Palace of Naples (Italian: Palazzo Reale di Napoli) is a historic building located in Piazza del Plebiscito, in the historic center of Naples, Italy. Although the main entrance is located in this square, there are other accesses to the complex, which also includes the gardens and the Teatro di San Carlo, from the Piazza Trieste e Trento, Piazza del Municipio and Via Acton.

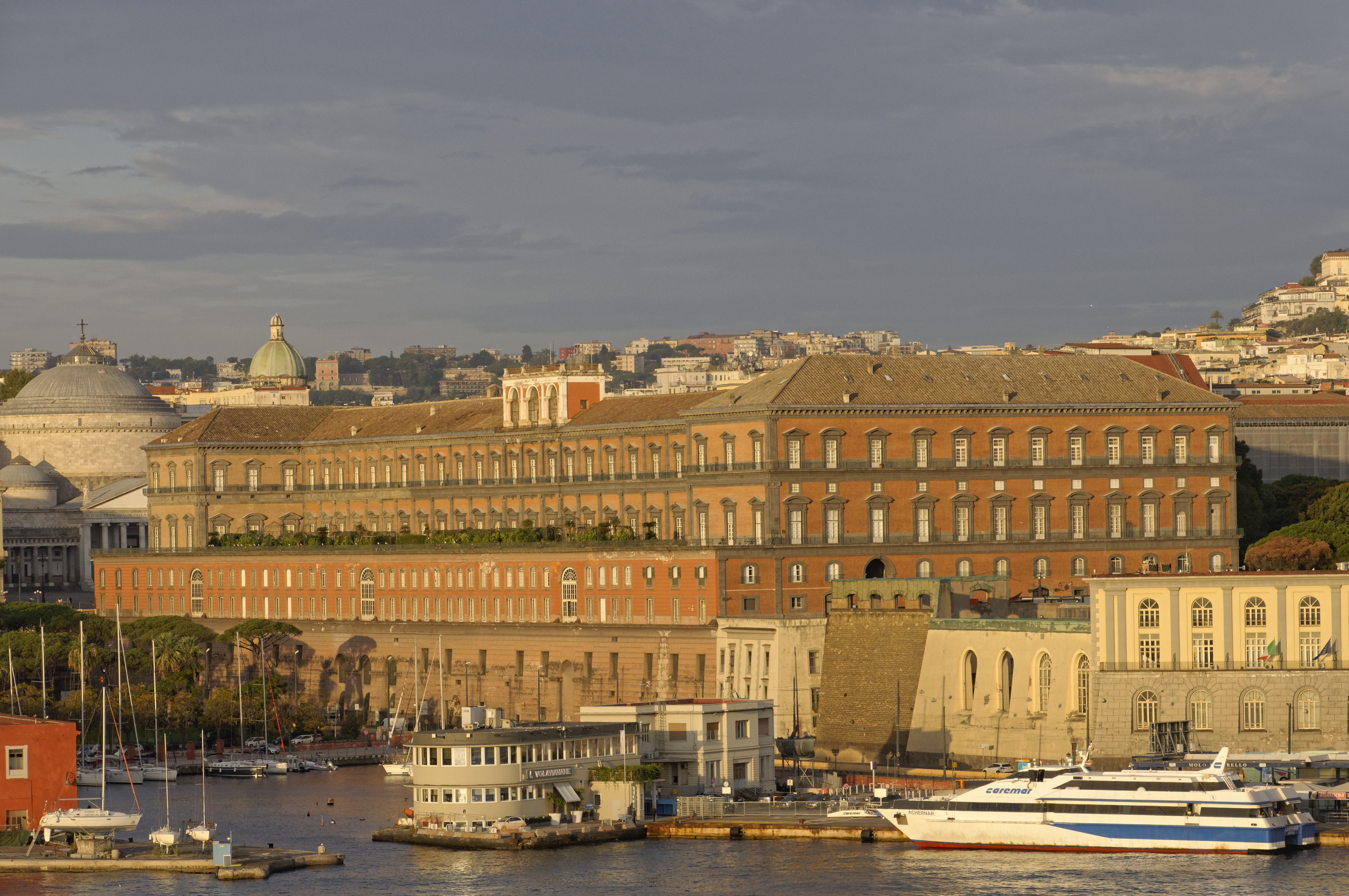
The Royal Palace of Naples

The palace was built from 1600 onwards by the architect Domenico Fontana as the residence of the Spanish viceroys, and in the mid-17th century Francesco Antonio Picchiatti made numerous improvements and interventions, such as the staircase and the chapel. Charles of Bourbon made it, from 1734, the main residence of the Bourbons of Naples for more than a hundred years, first as kings of Naples and Sicily (1734–1816) and later as kings of the Two Sicilies (1816–1861). It was also the residence of Joseph Bonaparte and Joachim Murat during French rule (1806–1815), under which extensive redecorations were carried out.

The Bourbons made important and constant modifications to the interiors of the palace, relying on great artists such as Francesco de Mura or Francesco Solimena. However, after the fire of 1837, the palace had to be almost completely rebuilt by Gaetano Genovese, who finished the unfinished wings and gave a homogeneous appearance to the entire complex.

After the Italian unification (1861) it passed into the hands of the Savoy, until Victor Emmanuel III ceded it to the state in 1919. From the late 19th century, the western half of the palace was opened to the public as a museum of the Royal Apartment, and in 1924 its eastern half became the home of the National Library, uses that continue today.

== History ==
=== Background ===
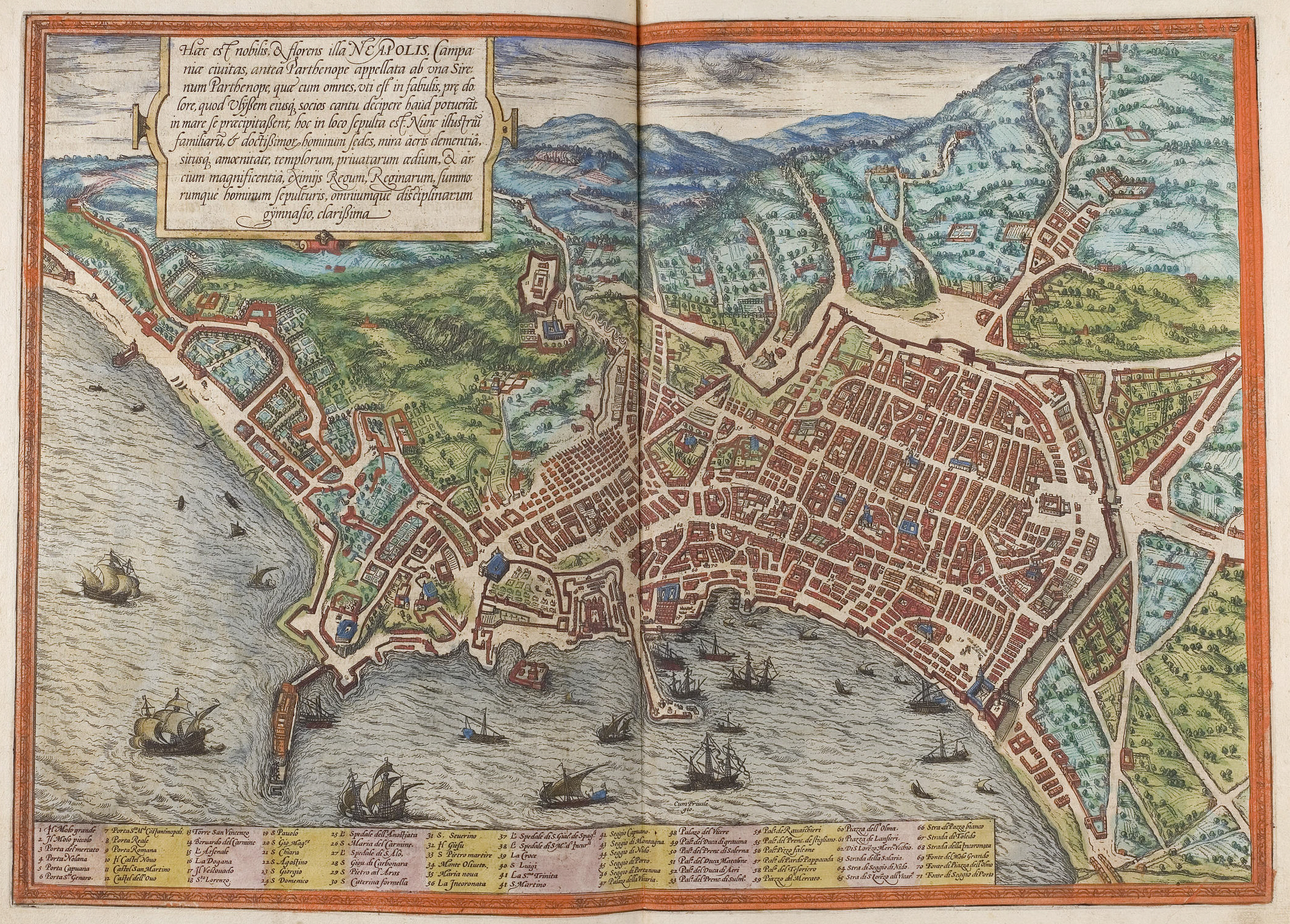
Map of Naples in the 16th century.

At the end of the Aragonese domination, the Kingdom of Naples entered into the expansionist objectives of the French and the Spanish: both powers divided the territory with the signing of the Treaty of Granada (1500). In any case, the treaty was not respected and under the command of the Great Captain Gonzalo Fernández de Córdoba the Spanish conquered the kingdom in 1503, thus beginning the Spanish viceroyalty. Although this period, which lasted more than two hundred years, has been considered a dark and devolutionary period, but in fact the city enjoyed a notable cultural ferment and a dynamic bourgeoisie, as well as a cutting-edge merchant fleet, capable of competing with those of Seville and Flanders.

Under the command of Pedro Álvarez de Toledo y Zúñiga, the construction of a viceregal palace was decided, designed by the architects Ferdinando Manlio and Giovanni Benincasa. The construction of the palace began in 1543 and was completed shortly afterwards. The new palace was born at a time when the viceroys dedicated their efforts to the urban reorganization of Italian cities: in Naples, the walls and forts were remodeled and the so-called Quartieri Spagnoli were built.

=== Construction (1600–1616) ===
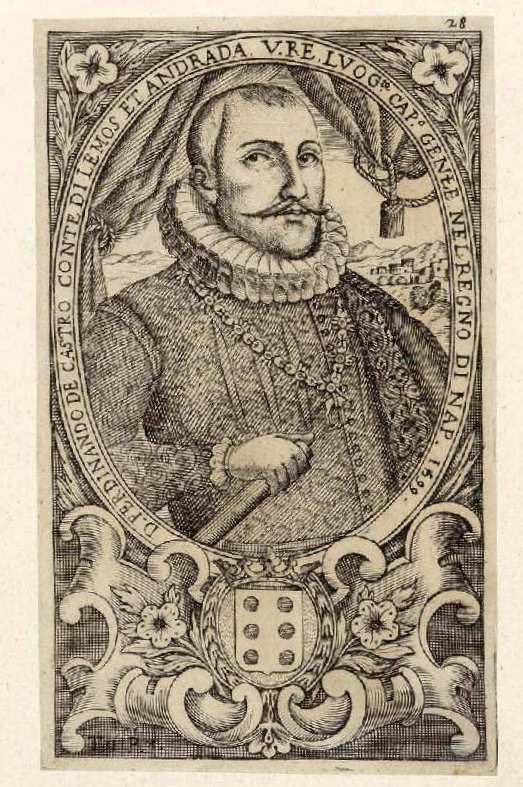
Fernando Ruiz de Castro, count of Lemos.

When Fernando Ruiz de Castro, count of Lemos, arrived in the city as viceroy Together with his wife, Catalina de Zúñiga, he decided to build a new palace. The official argument to justify its construction was to honor Philip III of Spain by hosting him solemnly in view of an imminent visit by the monarch that, in the end, never took place. However, contemporary analysis indicates that the viceroy knew that Philip III had never intended to move his court to Naples and that the palace was actually built to satisfy the viceroy's own wishes.

The area chosen for the new construction was located at the western end of the city, on the hill of Pizzofalcone, in a position that allowed the port to be dominated and that would facilitate an escape route for the king in case of an enemy attack. There it would be next to the Viceregal Palace, using, in fact, part of its gardens, and next to the Castel Nuovo, the former royal residence, reinforcing the courtly character of the area. The choice of this location was also encouraged by the fact that the city was expanding towards the west: in this way, with such an important building in the vicinity, the price of land in the areas of Pizzofalcone and Chiaia would increase.

The project was entrusted to Domenico Fontana, considered at the time the most prestigious architect in the western world, who held the position of chief engineer of the kingdom. Fontana had fallen into disgrace a few years earlier, due to the death of Sixtus V in 1590, the pope who had commissioned him to carry out numerous works in Rome.

The first stone was laid in 1600, in the square that, in those years, bore the name of Piazza San Luigi. The final project for the palace was published by Fontana in 1604 under the title Dichiarazione del Nuevo Regio Palagio. However, the original plans used by the architect to begin the work were lost and, in fact, Fontana himself lamented this:

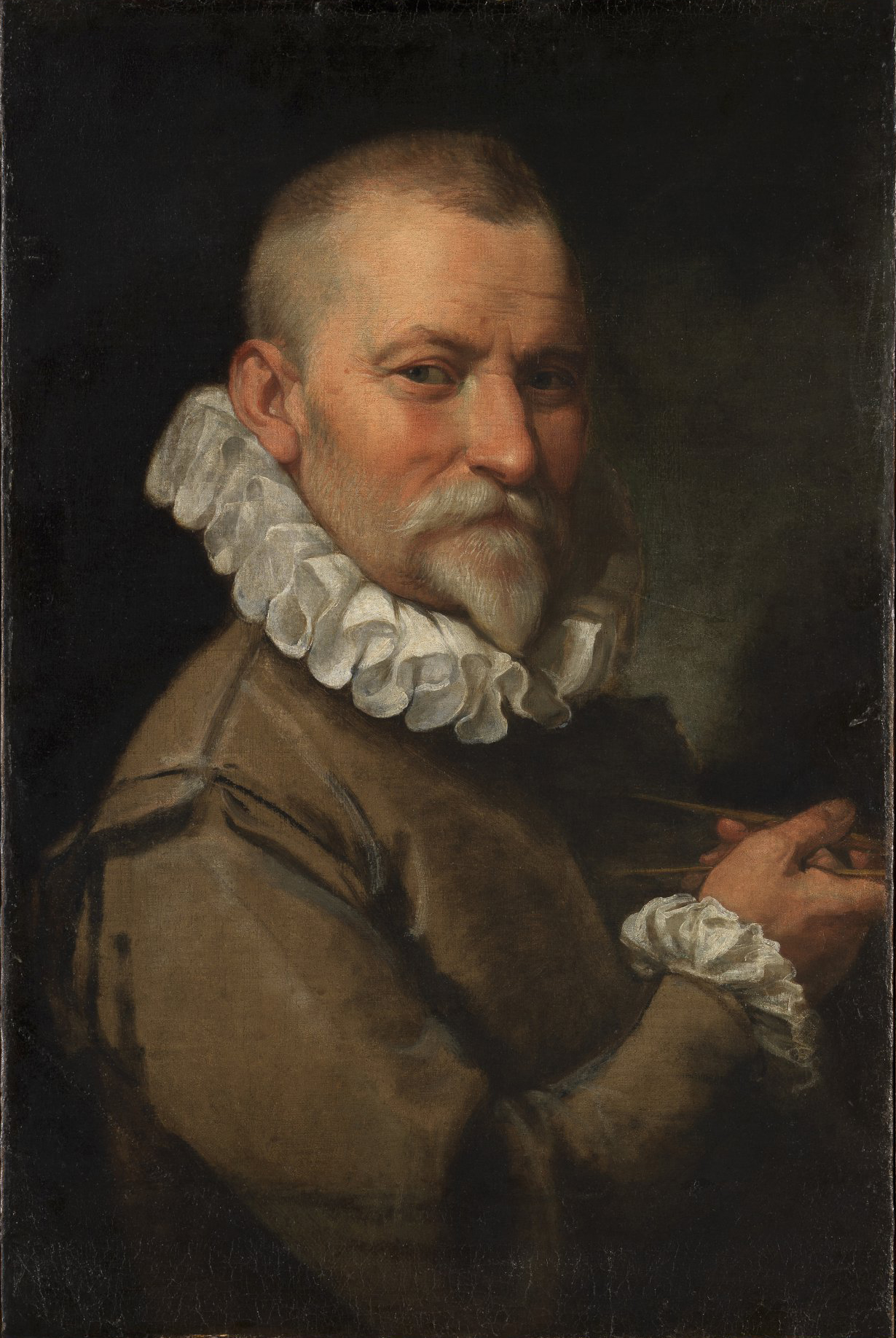
Domenico Fontana, the architect of the palace.

I have not been able to print the designs for the work I have done in this city of Naples and its kingdom due to lack of time.

— Domenico Fontana

In any case, a plan drawn by Giovanni Giacomo is preserved in Rome, probably before 1651, which shows how the palace was intended to have been according to the architect's first wishes. In any case, the original design does not seem to have differed too much from its final appearance, although undeniable modifications were made during its construction. In this design, both the main west and north facades were the same, while a C-shaped structure was supposed to have been built along the south side facing the sea. This design was so popular that, even though the palace was still under construction, the press of the time often depicted it as it was in the plans rather than as it was actually being built. Domenico Fontana was so enthusiastic about the project he had been commissioned to do that he had the following inscriptions inscribed on two columns of the façade:

Domenicus Fontana Patricius Romanus
Eques Auratus comes palatinus inventor

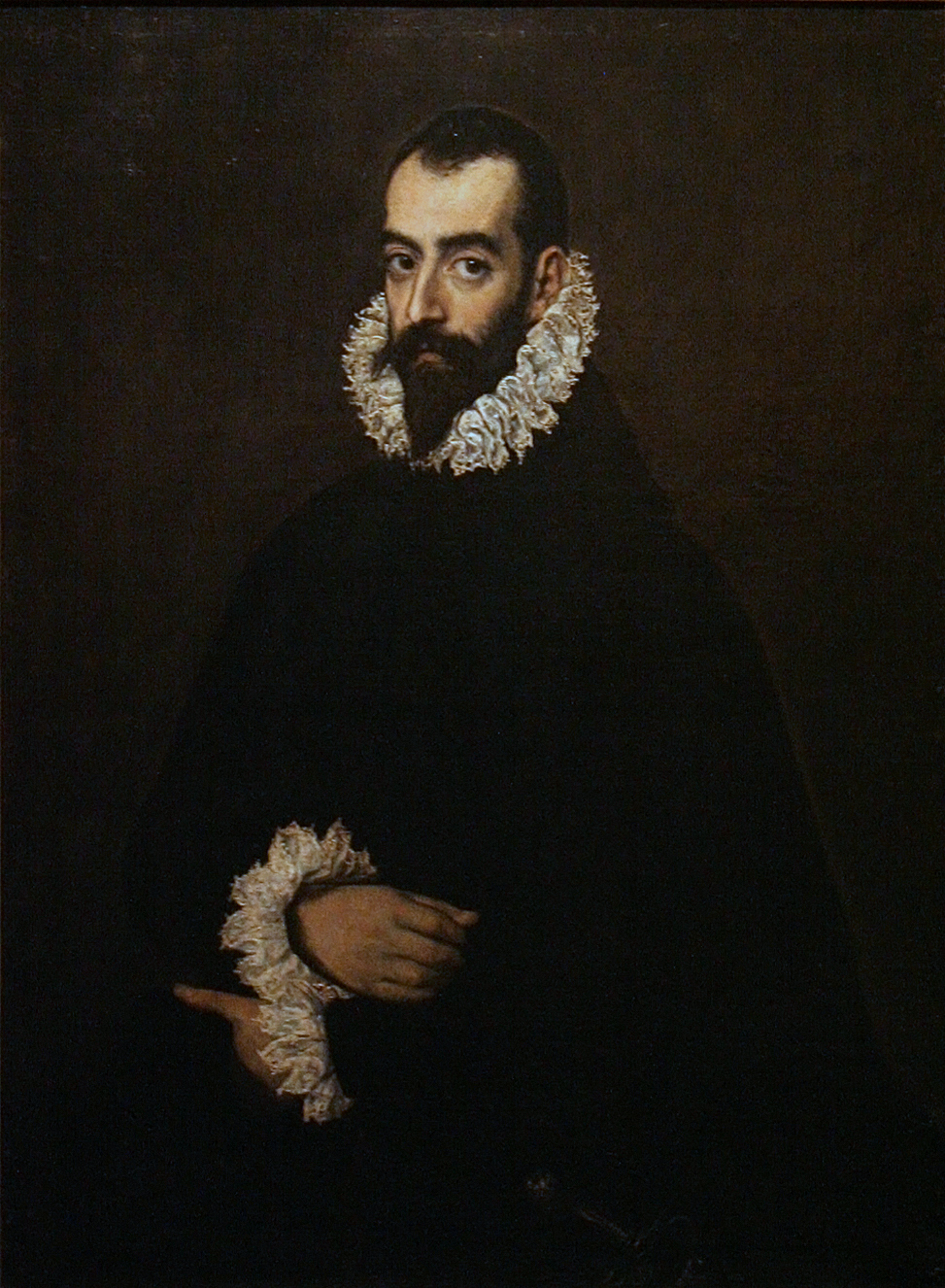
Juan Alonso Pimentel de Herrera, under whose mandate the work on the palace was slowed down.

However, only the main façade of this project was completed; while the south-east arm was not built and the south façade remained unfinished and disordered until it was completed in 1843.

The architectural style developed by the architect was late Renaissance, with a central courtyard and an interior loggia on the first floor, thus adapting the project to the demands of the time; that is, to a function of ostentation rather than a fortified residence. It also had a large square located right in front of the palace for military parades and public events. The works were carried out diligently both under the mandate of the Count of Lemos and under that of his son and successor Francisco Ruiz de Castro. Under Viceroy Juan Alonso Pimentel de Herrera, Count of Benavente, the works slowed down, probably due to the limited availability of resources after the wars and crises that hit Spain or even as a matter of honour: the Pimentels showed little interest in completing a work begun by the Ruiz de Castro.

In 1607, after the death of his father, Giulio Cesare Fontana took over the direction of the works. The construction of the palace continued rapidly, until in 1610 Pedro Fernández de Castro, also the son of Fernando Ruiz de Castro, was appointed viceroy. In 1616, the new headquarters of the university was built at the end of Via Toledo, that is, at the opposite end to the site on which the Royal Palace was being built. It was named Palazzo degli Studi and would be the future headquarters of the National Archaeological Museum of Naples. Thanks to some notes by Alessandro Beratta and the writings in a travel diary by Confalonieri, we have evidence of the state of the works in that year:

That day we saw the structure of the royal palace, which has a facade of peperino (Note: Peperino is a volcanic rock characteristic of the Naples area.) worked. On the first floor there are twenty-one windows and three railings; on the second floor, there are as many small windows without railings. Below, at ground level, there is a large portico, which faces the street and serves as a guard, carried out by two companies of soldiers. Inside the palace is not finished. It has two large staircases and a large square courtyard with porticos, of which two sides were still uncovered.

From this writing, it is clear that the work was almost finished at that time.

Shortly afterwards, although the exact date is not known, the interior decoration work began with the execution of the paintings by Giovanni Battista Caracciolo, Belisario Corenzio and Giovanni Balducci.

=== The Viceregal Period (1616–1734) ===
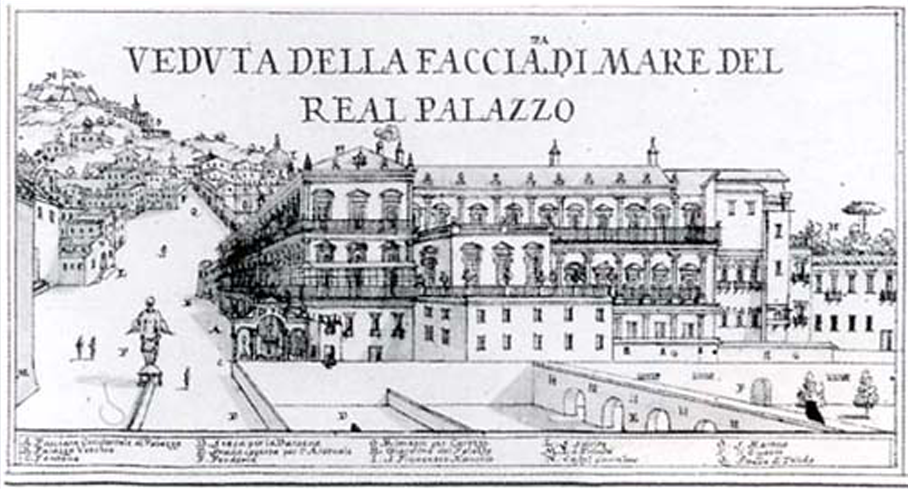
The Royal Palace around 1700, with the Belvedere Pavilion attached to its south-west corner.

From the time the palace was completed, it was inhabited by 22 Spanish viceroys and 11 Austrian viceroys. Far from remaining unchanged, the Royal Palace continued to transform itself according to the tastes of each viceroy.

The Duke of Alba (1622–1629) was commissioned to finish some vaults begun by the Count of Lemos and dedicate them to the family glories. The Palatine Chapel was completed under the Duke of Medina de las Torres, from 1646 to 1648, with a large altarpiece by José de Ribera; in 1656 the stucco work on the vault of the interdeux of the windows was carried out, which had to be redone after 1688 due to an earthquake that collapsed the roof. They were not finished until 1705.

Under the government of Íñigo Vélez de Guevara el Mozo, Count of Oñate, the original two-ramp staircase of Fontana, judged undignified, was completely renovated by Francesco Antonio Picchiatti, following the wishes of the Count of Oñate, the works took place from 1651 to 1666. The two main rooms of the palace were also redecorated: the "Great Hall" and the "Hall of the Viceroys", which began to be adorned with portraits of the viceroys from 1503.

Exteriorly, between 1666 and 1671, when Pedro Antonio de Aragón was in power, the most notable addition took place with the construction of a small pavilion facing the sea, the so-called Belvedere, which would serve as a bedroom for the viceroys and later for the Bourbon sovereigns. Attached to it was a small garden terrace that grew over the decades to become the current "hanging gardens or Belvedere gardens".

From 18 April to 2 June 1702, Philip V visited Naples, being therefore the first and only Spanish sovereign to stay in a palace originally intended to receive Philip III. In 1707 the Austrians took the city in the midst of the War of the Spanish Succession, beginning the government of the Austrian viceroys that did not bring substantial changes to the palace.

=== The first Bourbons (1734–1806) ===
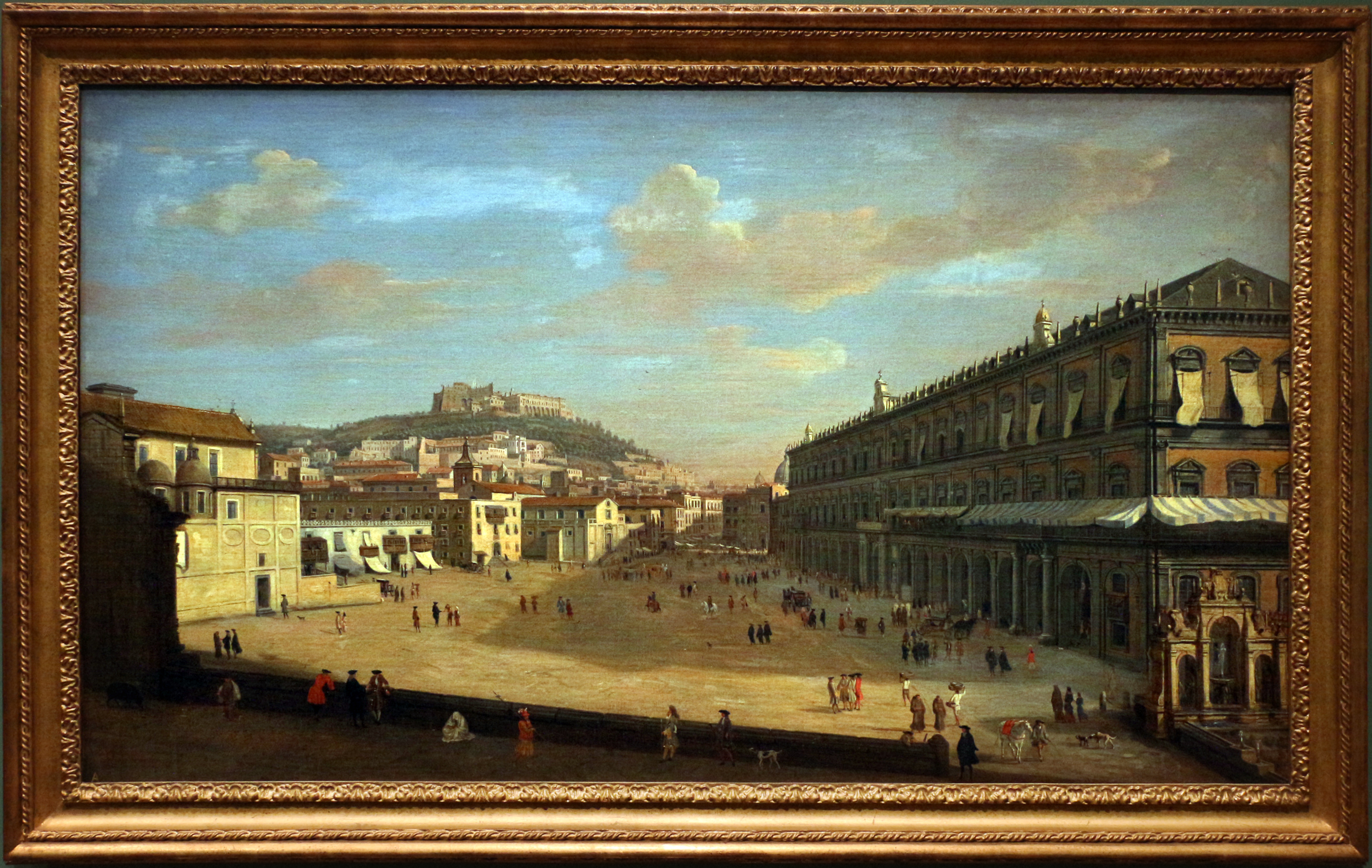
The Largo di Palazzo painted by Gaspar van Wittel between 1700 and 1725.

In May 1734 Charles of Bourbon entered Naples, the city became, once again, the capital of an autonomous kingdom and not a viceroyalty. The new king found the Royal Palace empty and dilapidated, since, since its construction, it had been normal for viceroys to move in with their furniture and, once their mandate had ended, to take it with them. This was done by the last Austrian viceroys, Giulio Visconti Borromeo Arese, in March 1734. All that remained in the palace were the magnificent painted vaults made by Neapolitan artists of the 17th century.

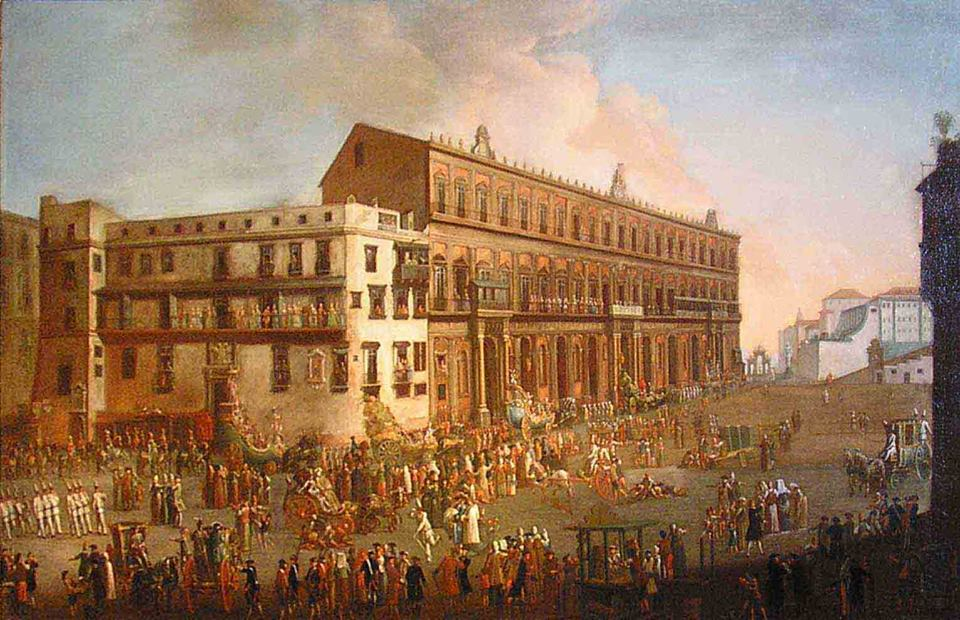
The Royal Palace of Naples (right) and the Viceregal Palace (left) during the carnival of 1774, by Alessandro D'Anna.

The renovation works were directed by the military engineer Giovanni Antonio Medrano, later architect of the Royal Palace of Portici, and initially focused on the king's apartments facing the Piazza della Repubblica. Although the works were completed in 1740, by 1738, the year of Charles's wedding with Maria Amalia of Saxony, they were almost ready. The palace was then structured around two main rooms or apartments:

- the King's Apartment facing the square and composed of: the Great Hall or Royal Room, the Room of the Guard of Corps, the Room of the Officers, the Antechamber of the Titleholders, the Room of the Hand-Kissing or of the Throne, the Gallery, the Room "where His Majesty dresses", the "secret" Chapel of His Majesty, the Belvedere Room or where the king sleeps, the "toilet" and the Room "where His Majesty's valet sleeps".
- the Queen's Apartment facing the sea and composed of: the Room of the Viceroys, the Room of the Guard of Corps, the Second Antechamber, the Room of the Kissing Hands, the Room of the Alcove or where the queen sleeps, the Oratory, the "toilet", the Chambermaids' Room and the Queen's Boudoir.

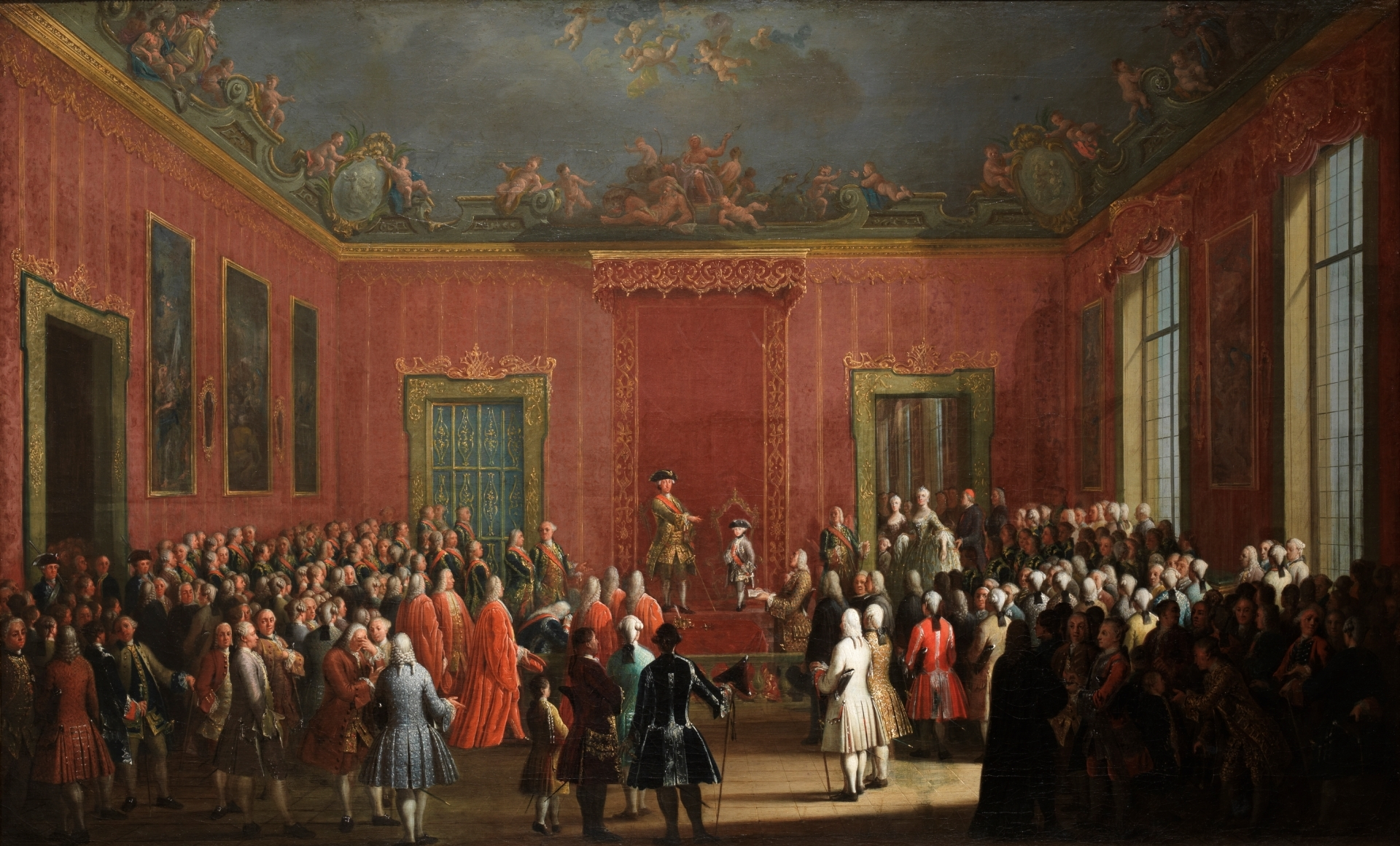
Abdication of Charles of Bourbon in favour of his son Ferdinand IV in the Throne Room of the Royal Palace of Naples, 1759.

In general, in this first reform, the works that evoked the history of Naples and its Spanish past were preserved as a sign of historical prestige, while those that referred to the Austrian period were destroyed. From 1735 to 1738, large celebratory frescoes were commissioned from Neapolitan late Baroque painters such as Francesco Solimena, Nicola Maria Rossi, Francesco de Mura and Domenico Vaccaro. For example, Rossi painted a fresco celebrating the taking of Gaeta in 1734 in the "Room where His Majesty dresses" (Room IX); Solimena painted another fresco of the king on horseback in the "Room of the Viceroys" (Room XXII), covering up an earlier one of Charles VI, Holy Roman Emperor; and de Mura painted another fresco of large proportions in the "Room of the Guard" (Room II) celebrating marital virtues following the royal wedding. Finally, the sovereign redecorated the interior of the palace with sumptuous marble and silk hangings.

During the reign of Charles of Bourbon, the Royal Palace of Naples was a meeting place for the French lifestyle, Spanish tradition and Italian artistic culture.

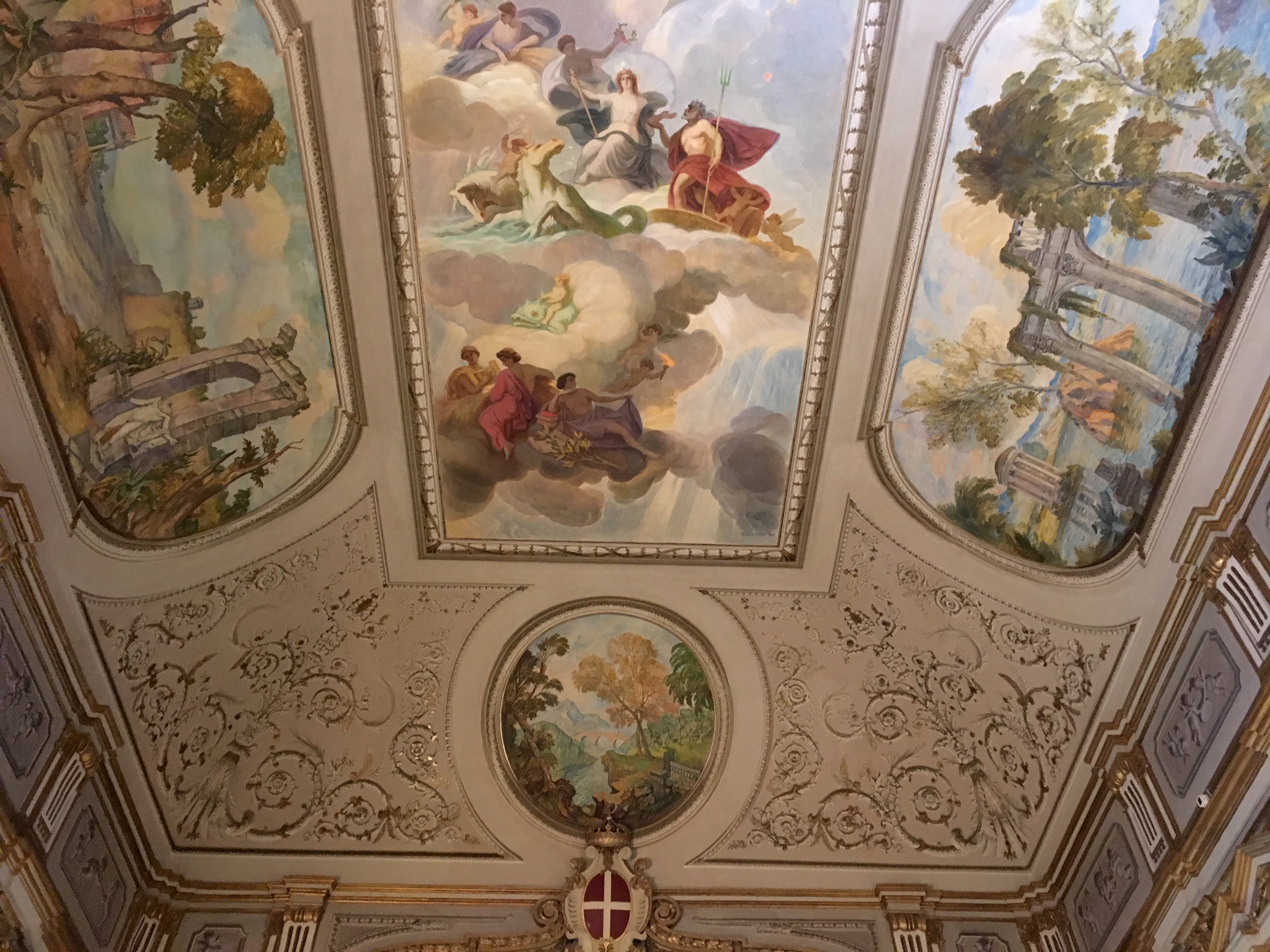
Ceiling of the new "Court Theatre", restored after the Second World War.

During the minority of Ferdinand IV, from 1759 to 1767, it is worth highlighting the progressive extension of the palace towards the east (towards the Castel Nuovo), with the construction, around 1760, of the eastern wing that ran parallel to the so-called "Steward's Apartment" facing the sea and the hanging gardens systematized around 1740. Following these extensions, two interior courtyards called "de "the Carriages" and "the Belvedere". There were also important decorative changes, such as the extension in 1763 of the Belvedere Wing facing the sea with the "daily bedroom of His Majesty", four private cabinets and the king's study; most of the rooms decorated with frescoes by Giuseppe Bonito. However, the most notable reform, coinciding with the end of the minority and the marriage of the King to the Archduchess Maria Carolina of Austria in May 1768, was the transformation of the Spanish-era "Grand Hall" into a late-baroque court theatre by Ferdinando Fuga.

From 1780 onwards, the interest of Ferdinand IV and Maria Carolina turned to the Caserta Palace, where their apartments had been completed. From then on, the court would spend at least half the year outside Naples.

=== The Bonapartes (1806–1815) ===
The arrival of the French in 1806 and the beginning of the reigns of Joseph Bonaparte (1806–1808) and Joachim Murat (1808–1815) did not bring about major architectural changes to the royal palace, but it did bring about major interior and decorative transformations, most of which have now disappeared. The Napoleonic monarchs had to deal first of all with a general refurnishing of the palace, which Ferdinand IV had emptied when he went into exile in Palermo in 1798 and 1806. Although some interventions had already taken place under Joseph, from 1809 to 1810 the reforms were essentially functional, to convert the palace into a habitable residence. From 1810 to 1814 the major works took place, but were never completed.

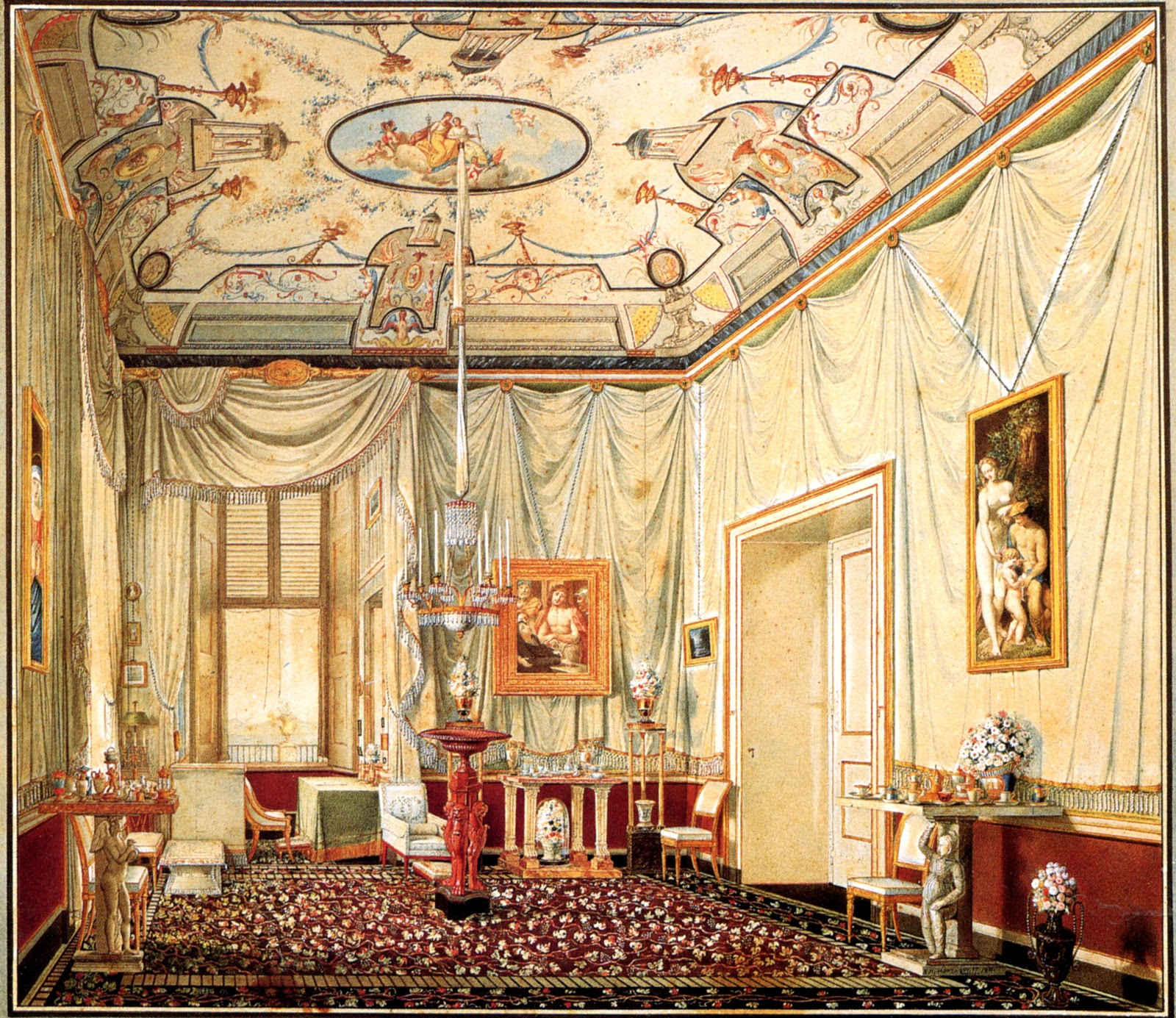
Carolina Bonaparte's study in the Royal Palace of Naples, painted in 1811 by Elie Honoré de Montagny.

In addition to a joint "grand apartment of ceremony", Joachim Murat and Caroline Bonaparte each had an "apartment of honour" and an "ordinary apartment", Murat's apartments were concentrated in the western core of the palace, while Caroline's were grouped in the eastern wing formerly intended for the royal princes (now the seat of the National Library of Naples). The Belvedere garden was the connection between the royal couple's private apartments and also a play area for their children. Among the transformations of the period, it is worth highlighting the new theatre by Caroline Murat in the eastern wing or the bedroom in the form of a military tent for Joachim in the Belvedere Wing.

The fall of the Bonapartes in 1815 prevented further transformations, such as the new throne room in the "Gallery of the Ambassadors" (now Room 8). However, two spaces were deeply marked by that period. On the one hand, the Royal Chapel, to which Joseph Bonaparte had already added the sumptuous altar of pietra dura from Santa Maria degli Scalzi, was remodelled in Byzantine style and inaugurated in 1814; although it would be rebuilt after the fire of 1837 and destroyed during the Second World War. On the other hand, in the "Hall of the Viceroys" the gallery of portraits of these disappeared and it was transformed into an antiquarium, adding plaster copies of the sculptures of the royal collection; due to the Farnese Hercules the room began to be called "Hall of Hercules", the sculptures were also lost in 1837.

=== The Bourbon Restoration (1815–1837) ===
After the reconquest of Naples by the Bourbons, only cosmetic but highly symbolic modifications took place in the palace. In 1818, Ferdinand IV, now Ferdinand I of the Two Sicilies, undertook the complete redecoration of the Throne Room, resacralizing the space after the Napoleonic interlude. Antonio de Simone designed the ceiling stuccos with fourteen allegories representing the provinces, united around the throne, of the new Kingdom of the Two Sicilies created in 1816 by unifying those of Naples and Sicily. The entire room was also covered with a red velvet hanging with gilded Bourbon lilies.

At that time, the division of the palace into two poles devised under the Bonapartes was perpetuated. On the western side facing the Largo di Palazzo was the "Grand Apartment of the King", while on the eastern wing facing the Castel Nuovo was the "Reception Apartment" of the Duke of Calabria, who enjoyed the old little theatre of Caroline Murat, as well as his private rooms and accommodation for his children. During his brief reign, Francis I continued to inhabit these same apartments, and after his death, they were occupied by his widow, the queen mother María Isabella of Spain.

=== The Transformation by Ferdinand II (1837–1861) ===
On 6 February 1837, at 5 am, a fire broke out in the Queen mother's chambers in the eastern wing, destroying much of the eastern half of the palace. After the disaster, a new restoration of the entire complex became necessary. King Ferdinand II commissioned the renovation by the architect Gaetano Genovese, who carried out the work between 1837 and 1844, restoring the parts damaged by the fire, extending and finishing others, and redecorating the interiors. Genovese followed the neoclassical and historicist trends prevailing at the time, without abandoning the original architecture of Domenico Fontana, to give a homogeneous appearance to the whole complex.

During the course of the work, the eastern wing facing the Castel Nuovo was completely remodelled; the Belvedere wing was demolished; the unfinished south façade facing the sea was completed, uniting it with the existing Fontana-era façade and crowning the central section with a new belvedere of white marble; and the private apartments of Ferdinand II and Maria Theresa of Austria were moved to the second floor, leaving the former first-floor apartments for official receptions only. The surroundings of the palace also underwent major transformations. Between 1841 and 1843 the Viceregal palace was demolished, creating in its place the Piazza San Ferdinando (now Piazza Trieste e Trento), and Friedrich Dehnhardt created a new romantic rear garden by demolishing old stables and other buildings.

The Royal Palace was then made up of several apartments grouped around two cores. In the western one, which constitutes the original palace, were the King and Queen's Etiquette Apartment (now the Royal Apartment) and the King's Apartment on the ground floor used for private receptions (now closed).

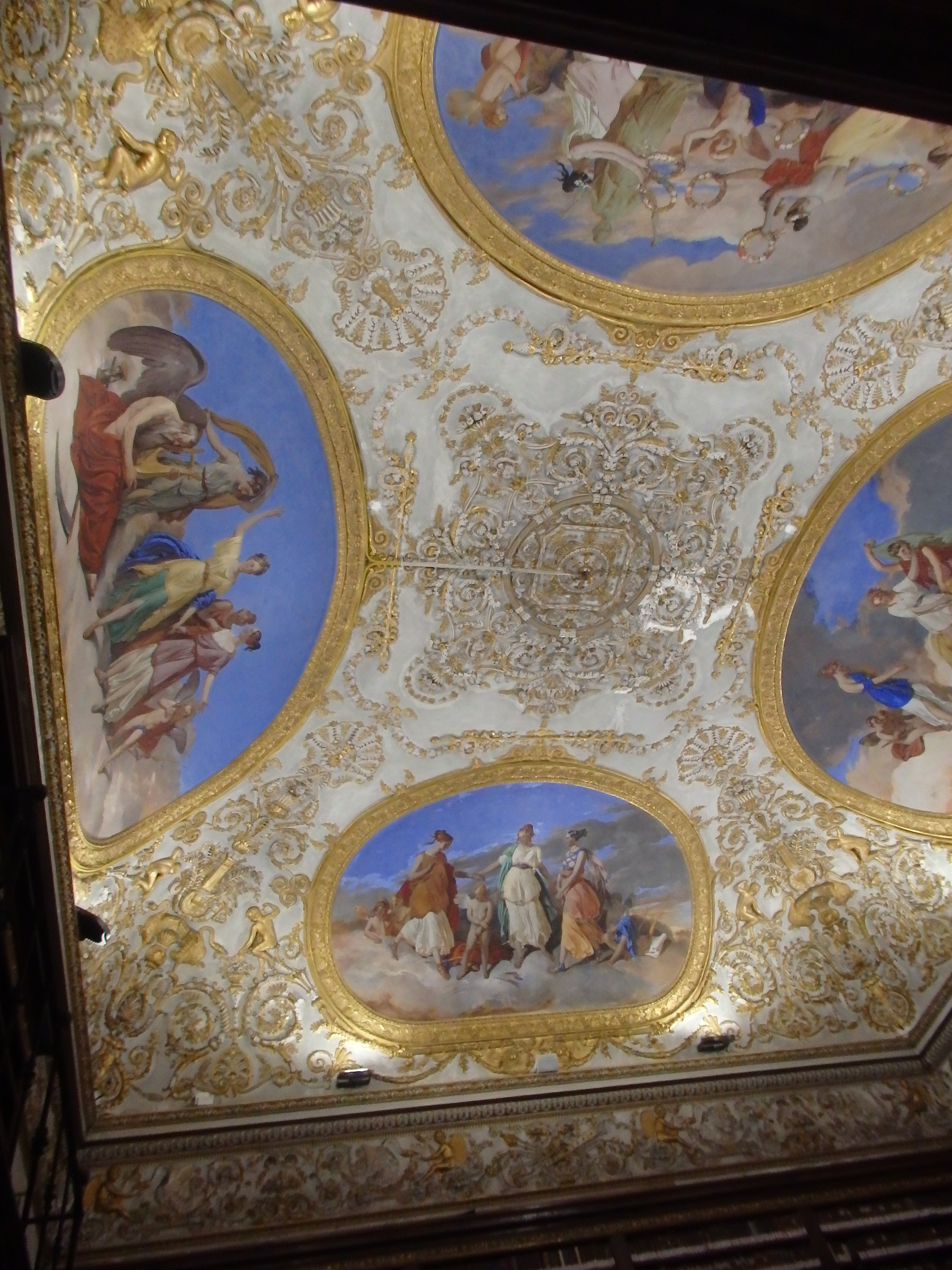
Ceiling of one of the rooms of the "Apartment of the Festivals", now the National Library.

In the eastern wing (now the National Library), made up of the extensions of the 18th and 19th centuries, were located the Apartment of the Festivals and the Apartment of the Duke of Calabria, on the first floor; and the Palatine Library, the King's Physics Office and the Private Apartment of the King and Queen on the second floor.

The decoration of the newly created spaces, as well as the renovations to some of the old ones, moved away from academic neoclassicism and adopted a more eclectic and historicist approach, close to the exuberance of Percier and Fontaine.

Few changes took place during the short reign of Francis II, who on 6 September 1860 had to abandon the palace and the city in the face of the threat of the Garibaldine troops. Before leaving, the sovereign packed some of his most precious possessions, which were sent to Capua and Gaeta, among which were Raphael's prized Pala Colonna, Titian's portrait of Alessandro Farnese, a marble bust of Pope Pius IX, the relics of Saint Jasonia, sixty-six reliquaries, a portrait of Louis XVIII, vases, porcelain, a nightstand with views of Paris on Sèvres plates, tablecloths, household linen, mattresses and cushions, twenty-six boxes containing silverware, seven déjeuners and one hundred and fifteen silver candlesticks. However, much of Queen Maria Sophie's wardrobe and the king's personal fortune deposited in the Banco di Napoli were left behind.

=== The Savoys (1861–1919) ===
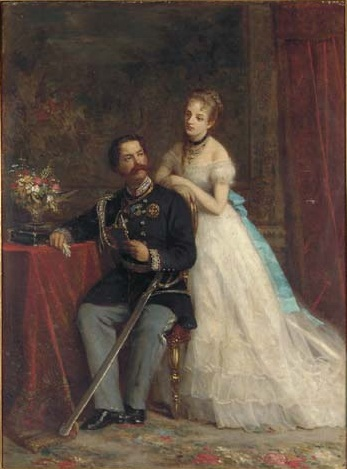
Umberto and Margherita during their stay in Naples.

After the fall of the Kingdom of the Two Sicilies in 1860 and the proclamation of the Kingdom of Italy, the palace became the residence of the House of Savoy. The new owner of the palace, Victor Emmanuel II, first visited the palace on 7 November 1860, just two months after Francis II of the Two Sicilies had left, and it does not seem that he ever stayed there again. The visits of the new dynasty to the city were generally sporadic. Only from 1868 to 1870, the palace served as a permanent residence for Prince Umberto and Princess Margherita, newly married in April 1868. It was in this palace that the future king Victor Emmanuel III was born on 11 November 1869. The couple left the city after the taking of Rome in September 1870.

After ascending to the throne in 1878, the new royal couple returned to Naples, but their stays were always bittersweet. In 1878 they were victims of the assassination attempt by Giovanni Passannante, in 1883 they returned to comfort the wounded in the earthquake at Casamicciola and in 1885 they returned to the victims of cholera. More fortunate was the visit in 1889, following the inauguration of the Corso Umberto I. The Prince of Piedmont, the future Victor Emmanuel III, also resided in Naples from 1891 to 1896. However, the royal family often preferred the Capodimonte palace, which was more isolated and had a larger garden.

The first decades after the Unification were also those of a slow process of emptying the palace's treasures: from 1862 to 1864 several modern paintings were moved to Capodimonte, in 1864 the Armory was moved and in 1873 the porcelain, both also to Capodimonte; In 1878 several tapestries were taken to the Quirinal Palace, in 1879 the instruments of the Physics Cabinet went to the University of Naples, before 1884 the royal carriages left for the Pitti Palace, the music archive was ceded to the Conservatory on an uncertain date and in 1921 it was the turn of the Archives of the Royal House, integrated into the State Archives of Naples.

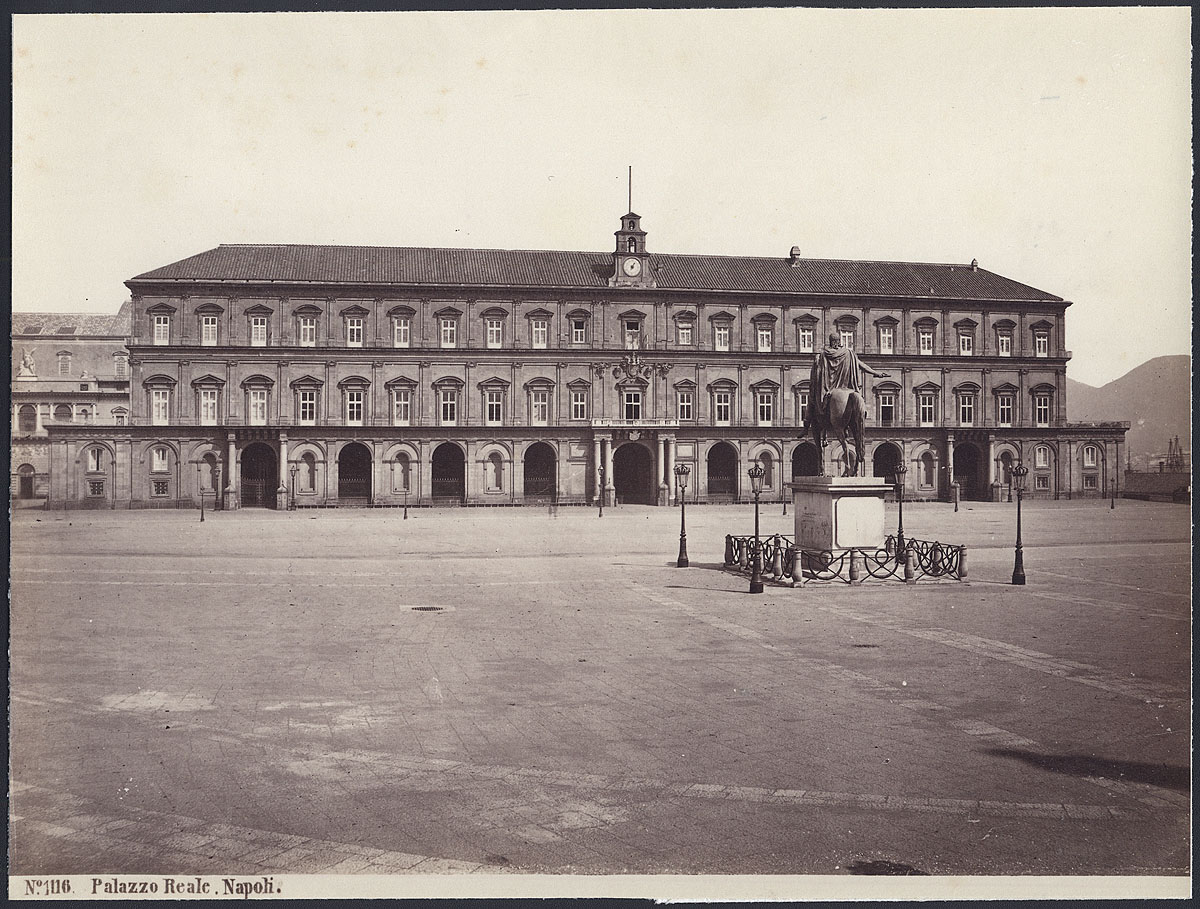
The main façade of the palace before the sculptures were installed in 1888.

However, it is also worth highlighting some specific interventions in the palace, such as the sumptuous neo-baroque furniture in the First Antechamber, carried out between 1862 and 1864; the coats of arms of the provinces of the new Kingdom of Italy painted in the Hall of Hercules around 1868 or the marouflage of the Assumption by Domenico Morelli made for the Royal Chapel in 1869. Another notable change was the replacement of the Bourbon fleur-de-lis by the Savoy cross in several places in the palace, including the main staircase, the court theatre and the throne itself. However, the most important and controversial intervention would be the installation, in 1888, in the niches of the main façade, of eight sculptures of the most important kings of Naples, including Victor Emmanuel II, despite the fact that he never held that title.

Likewise, the core of the palace was moved to the eastern wing, a process that had already begun with the reform of Ferdinand II. Umberto and Margherita were installed in the former apartment of Caroline Bonaparte, of duke of Calabria and then of Francis II. His son, Prince Victor Emmanuel (III), had it done just above, in the private apartments of Ferdinand II. The apartments were furnished with sumptuous new Neo-Baroque and Neo-Rococo furniture, as well as an extensive collection of contemporary paintings that Queen Margherita had been collecting.

In the old heart of the palace, the western wing, the so-called "Gala Apartment", was regularly open to the public.

=== Transfer to the State (1919–1940) ===
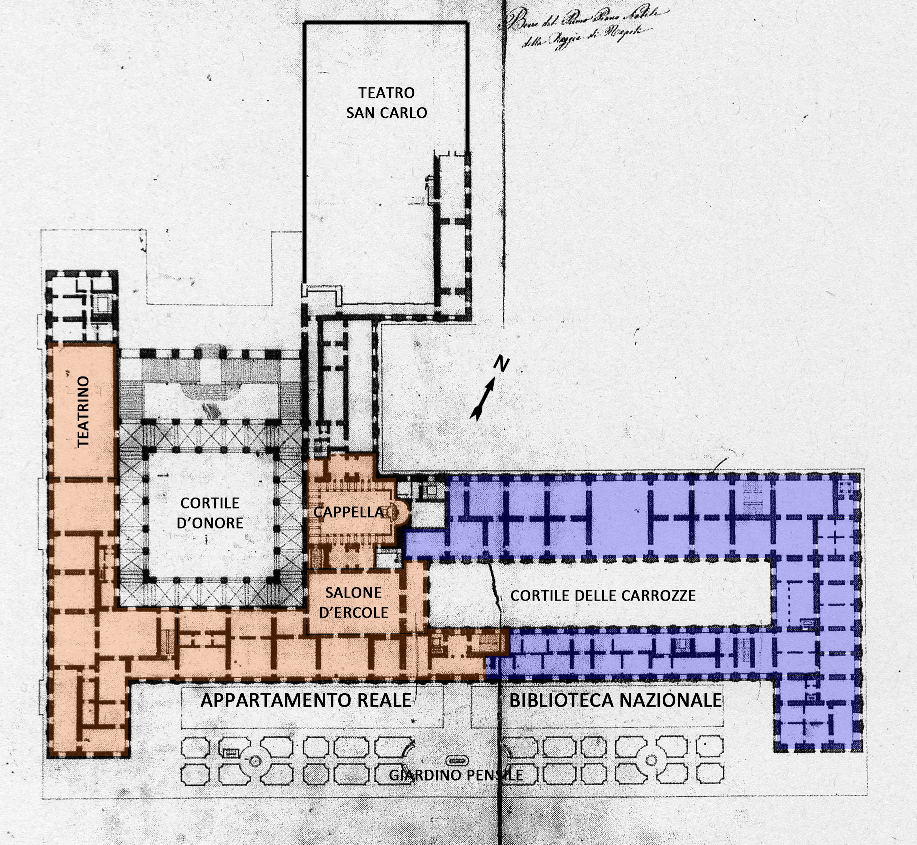
The Royal Palace of Naples after the transformations of the 1920s: in orange in the Royal Apartment, the original core of the building; in blue the eastern wing, current headquarters of the National Library.

The greatest change in the history of the Royal Palace of Naples took place in 1919, when King Victor Emmanuel III transferred the palace, along with many other royal residences, to the state. Three years later, between 1922 and 1924, following the impulse of Benedetto Croce, the National Library of Naples was installed in the eastern wing of the palace, the one that had been occupied by the various sovereigns and their families since the mid-19th century. This installation entailed the transfer and storage of the furniture and the loss of part of the decoration to make way for the shelves of the library. Only on the west side was the "Gala Apartment", since then called the "Royal Apartment", open to the public.

In 1931, the last royals to live in the palace moved in: Crown Prince Umberto (II) and his wife Princess Maria Jose of Belgium. On 24 September 1934, their first-born daughter, Princess Maria Pia of Savoy, was born in the palace; from then on, the couple preferred the privacy of the Villa Maria Pia in Posillipo.

=== From World War II to the new century (1940-2000) ===
During the Second World War the palace suffered considerable damage. On 4 August 1943, during an Allied bombing raid, the roof of the court theatre, the chapel and the bridge in the hanging garden, among other areas, were destroyed. The palace was then used as a welfare club by Anglo-American troops from 1943 to 1945. During this period, numerous thefts of works of art took place and a large number of curtains and hangings from the Royal Apartment were destroyed. The furniture was not so unlucky, as it was moved to a safe place at the beginning of the conflict.

The restoration took place from 1950 to 1954: the paintings were recovered, in some cases repainted; The original furniture was reinstalled and the silk elements originally made in San Leucio were reconstructed using the ancient looms.

In 1994, the seat of the regional government, which had been located in the Royal Palace since the beginning of the 20th century, was permanently moved to another location. In the middle of the second decade of the 21st century the façade was restored and some areas of the Royal Apartment were renovated. among them the corte theater.

== Exterior ==
=== The main façade ===
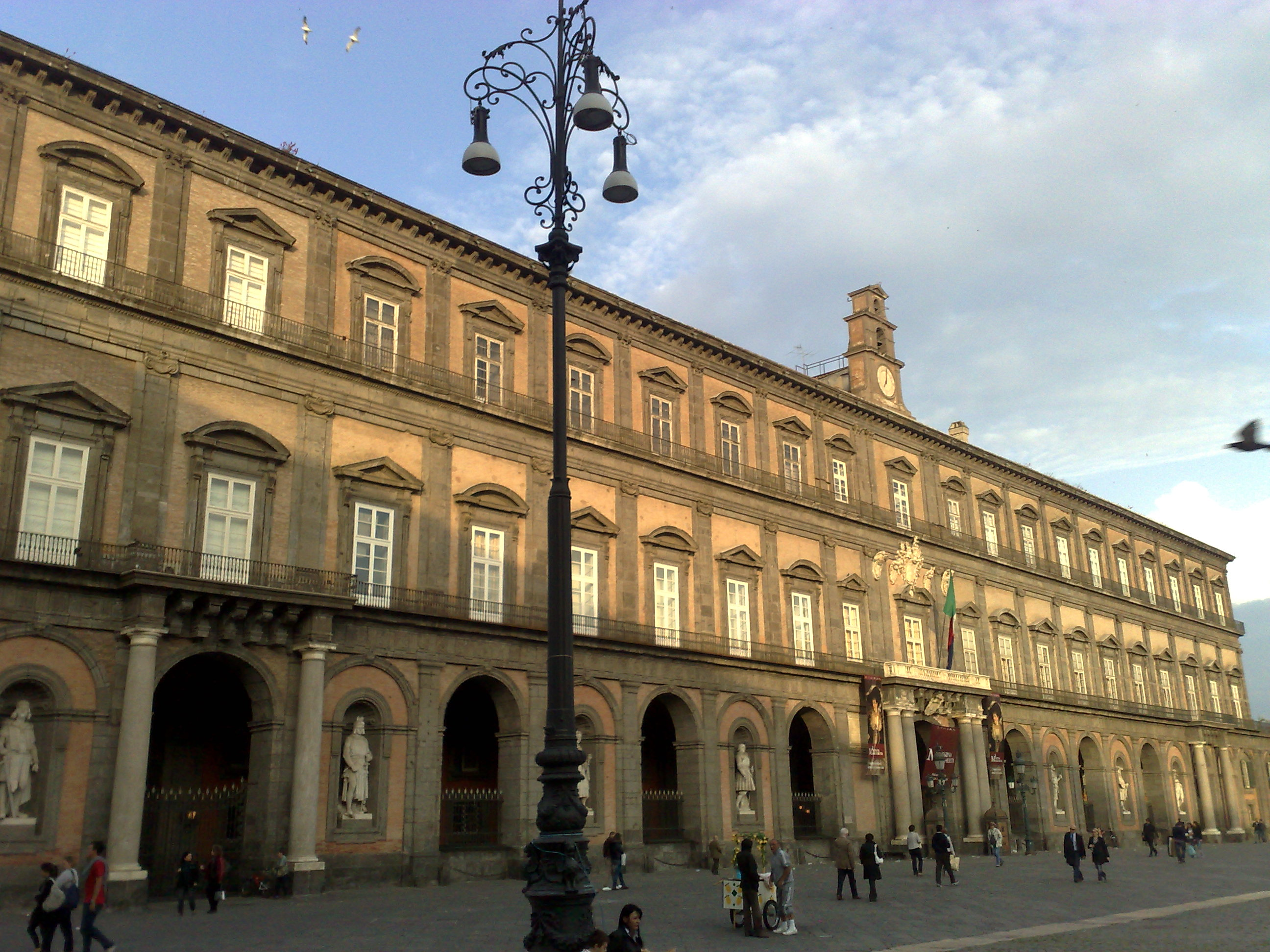
The main façade.

The main façade of the Royal Palace faces the Piazza del Plebiscito and was completed in 1616. It is one hundred and sixty-nine metres long and until 1843 was adjacent to that of the Viceregal Palace, which was demolished to make way for the Piazza Trieste e Trento. The façade is made of fired reddish clay bricks, piperno and volcanic stone from the Phlegraean Fields. The late Renaissance and Mannerist imprint can be seen in the superposition of several orders, typical of theatrical buildings of ancient Rome, such as the Coliseum or the Theatre of Marcellus; while the Mannerist can be appreciated in the modular design of the façade that could be repeated ad infinitum since it has no element that marks its beginning or its end, in the same way that, in the upper part, it does not find a conclusion due to the lack of a cornice. However, originally the cornice was crowned by obelisks, vases and three bell gables positioned vertically at each entrance. All of this was removed at the beginning of the 19th century, leaving only the central bell gable with the clock.

The architectural articulation follows the treatises of Vitruvius: the pilasters are arranged vertically and the three orders (at ground level we find the Tuscan order, followed by the Ionic and, finally, the Corinthian) are arranged horizontally. On the other hand, the two-tone use of materials stands out to highlight the architectural elements (in grey stone) on the walls (in reddish brick), a technique that would be very successful in Naples.

Originally, the lower part had porticos along its entire length, a very innovative decision for the time, designed by Fontana so that the people could walk around even in bad weather. However, after the Masaniello revolt and because of the structural problems of the pillars, which were being crushed, in 1753 the arches were walled up according to the project of Luigi Vanvitelli. Niches were opened in the new walls, but it was not until 1888 that statues of the main kings of Naples were placed in them, with the intention of showing a certain continuity between the House of Savoy and the previous dynasties of Neapolitan history. From left to right, we can recognize Roger II of Sicily, a work by Emilio Franceschi; Frederick II of Swabia, by Emanuele Caggiano; Charles of Anjou, by Tommaso Solares; Alfonso V of Aragon, by Aquiles De Osas; Charles V of Habsburg, by Vincenzo Gemito; Charles of Bourbon, by Raffaele Belliazzi; Joachim Murat, by Giovanni Battista Amendola and Victor Emmanuel II of Savoy, by Francesco Jerace.

Statues located in the horns of the main façade

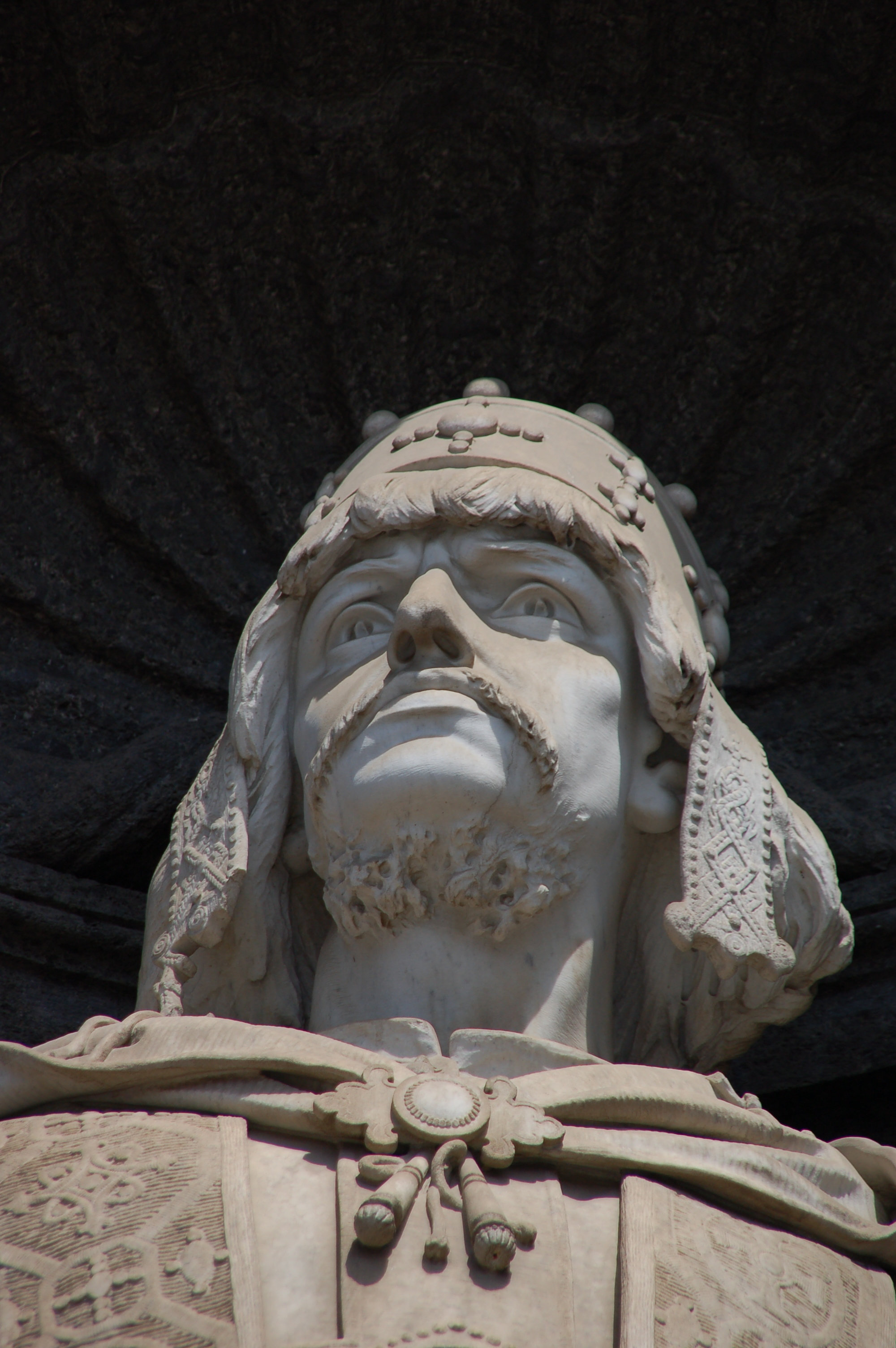
Roger II of Sicily.

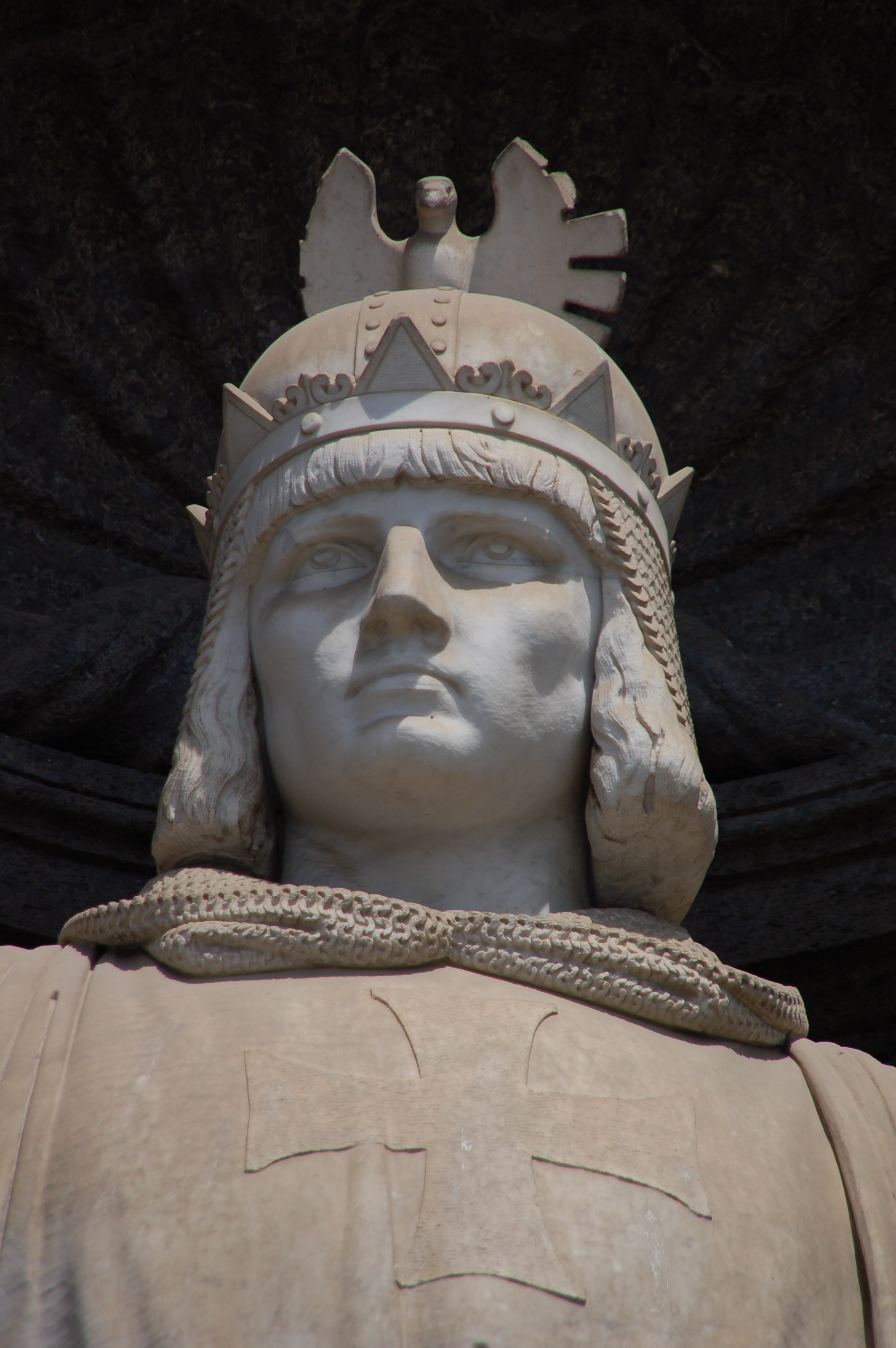
Frederick II Hohenstaufen.

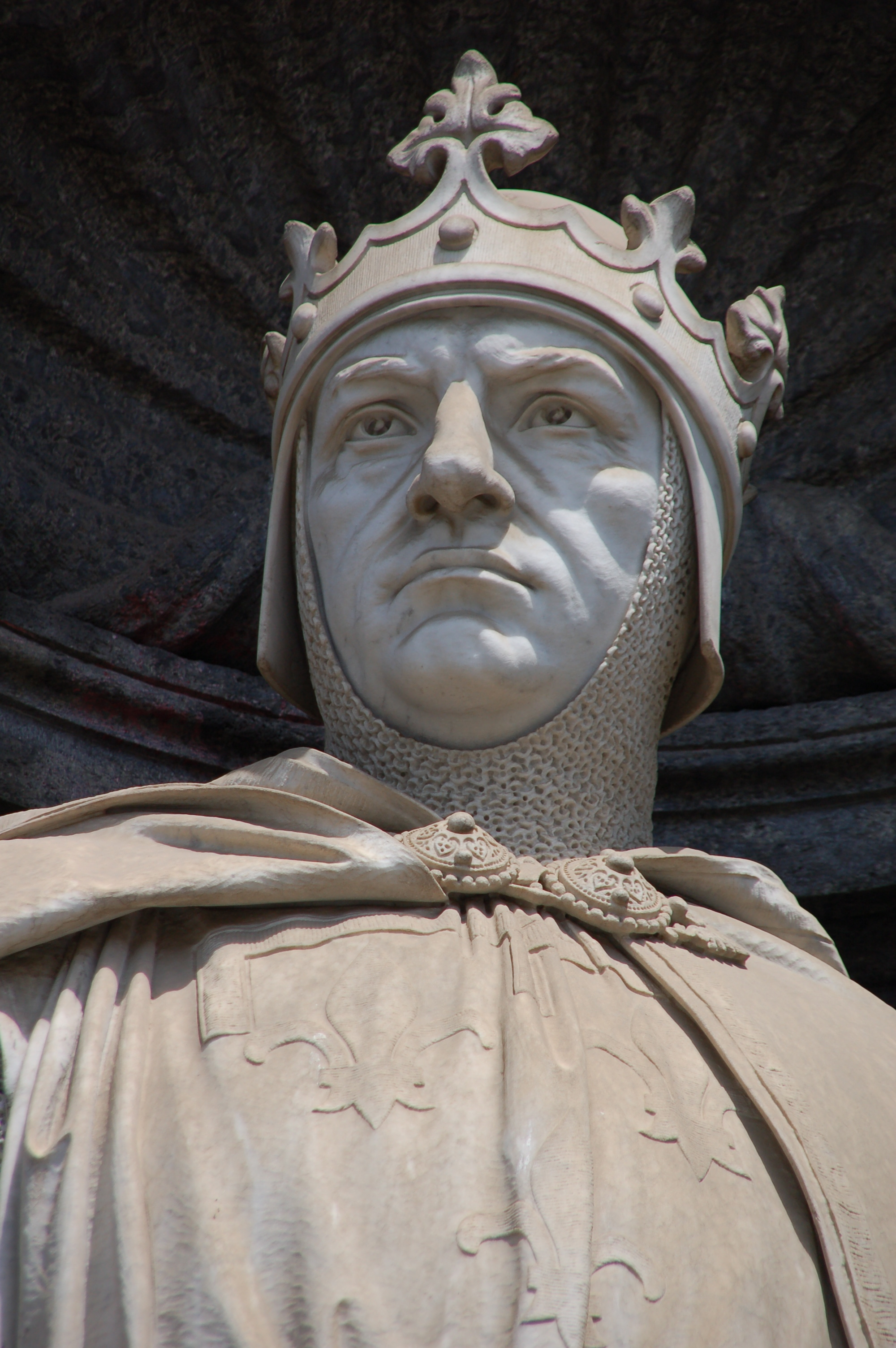
Charles of Anjou.

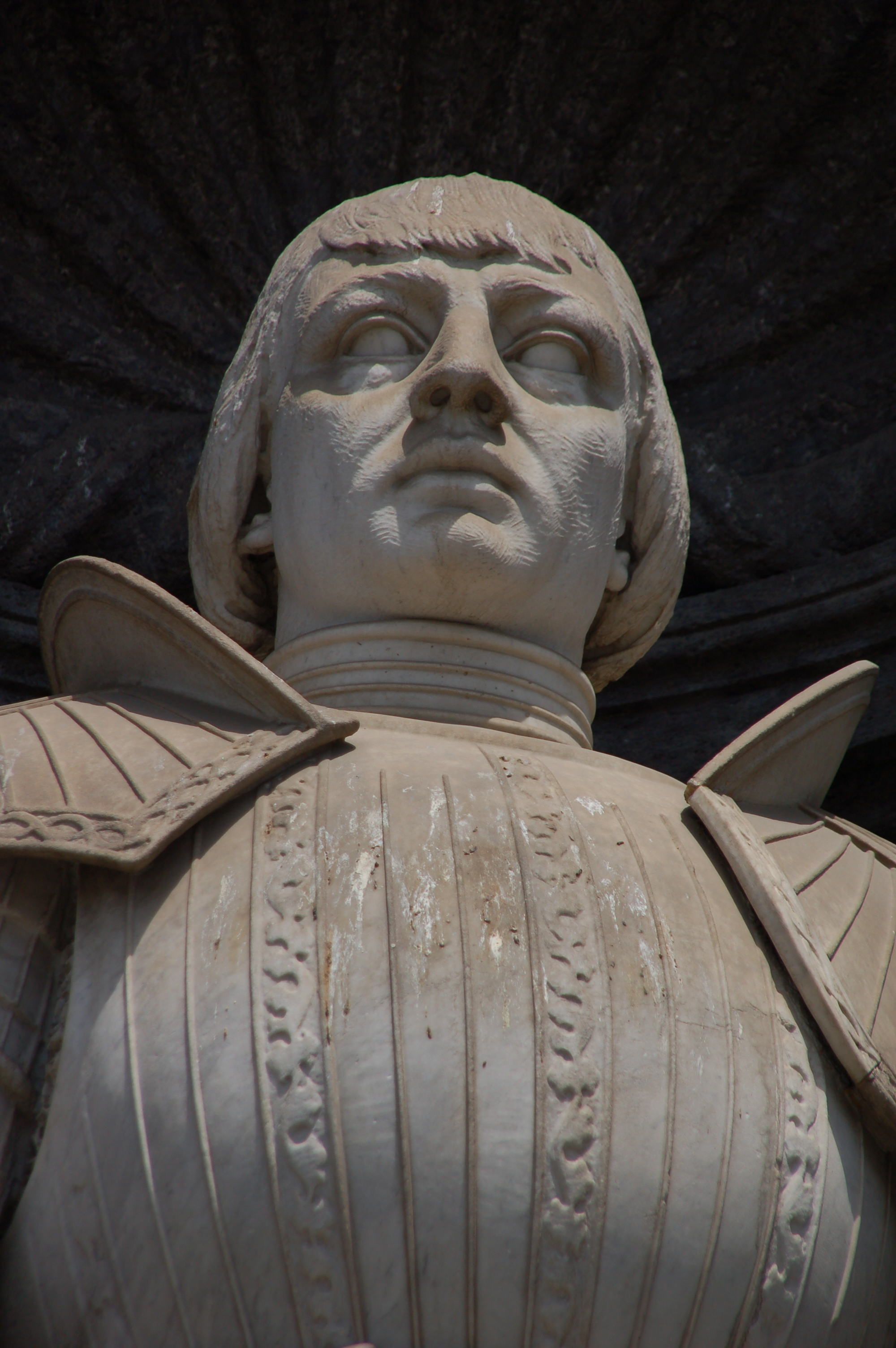
Alfonso V of Aragon.

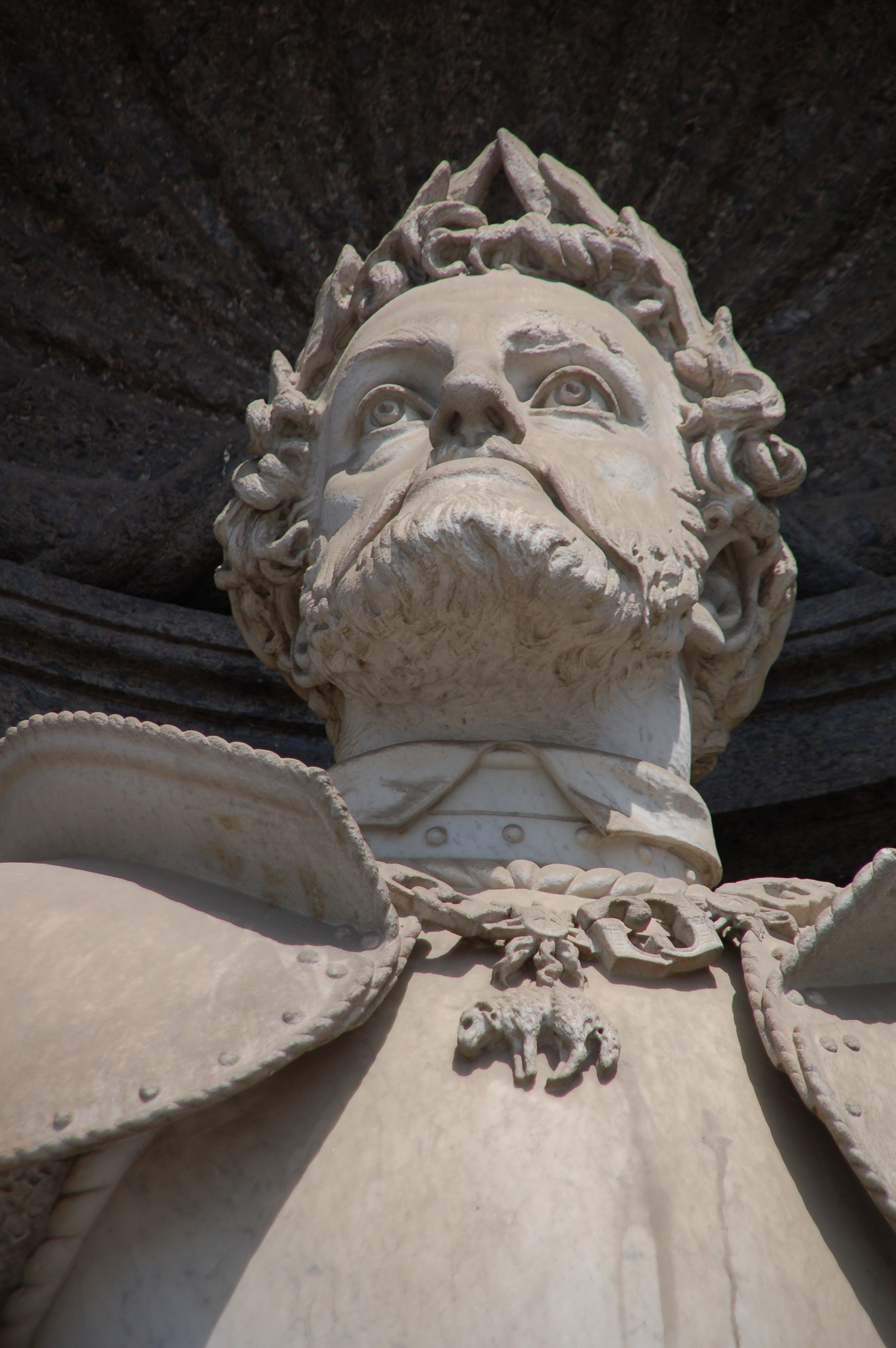
Charles IV of Naples.

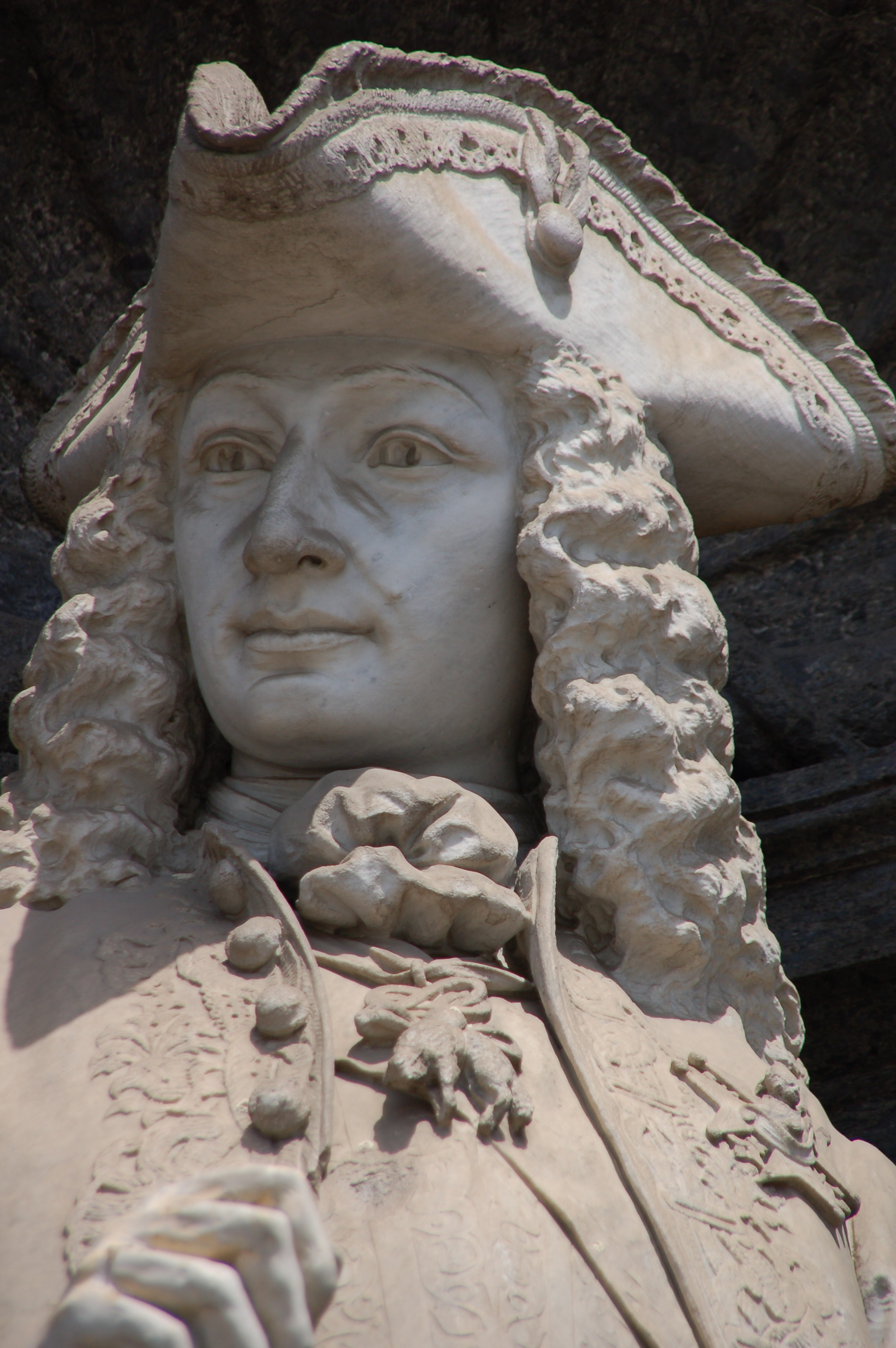
Charles VII of Naples.

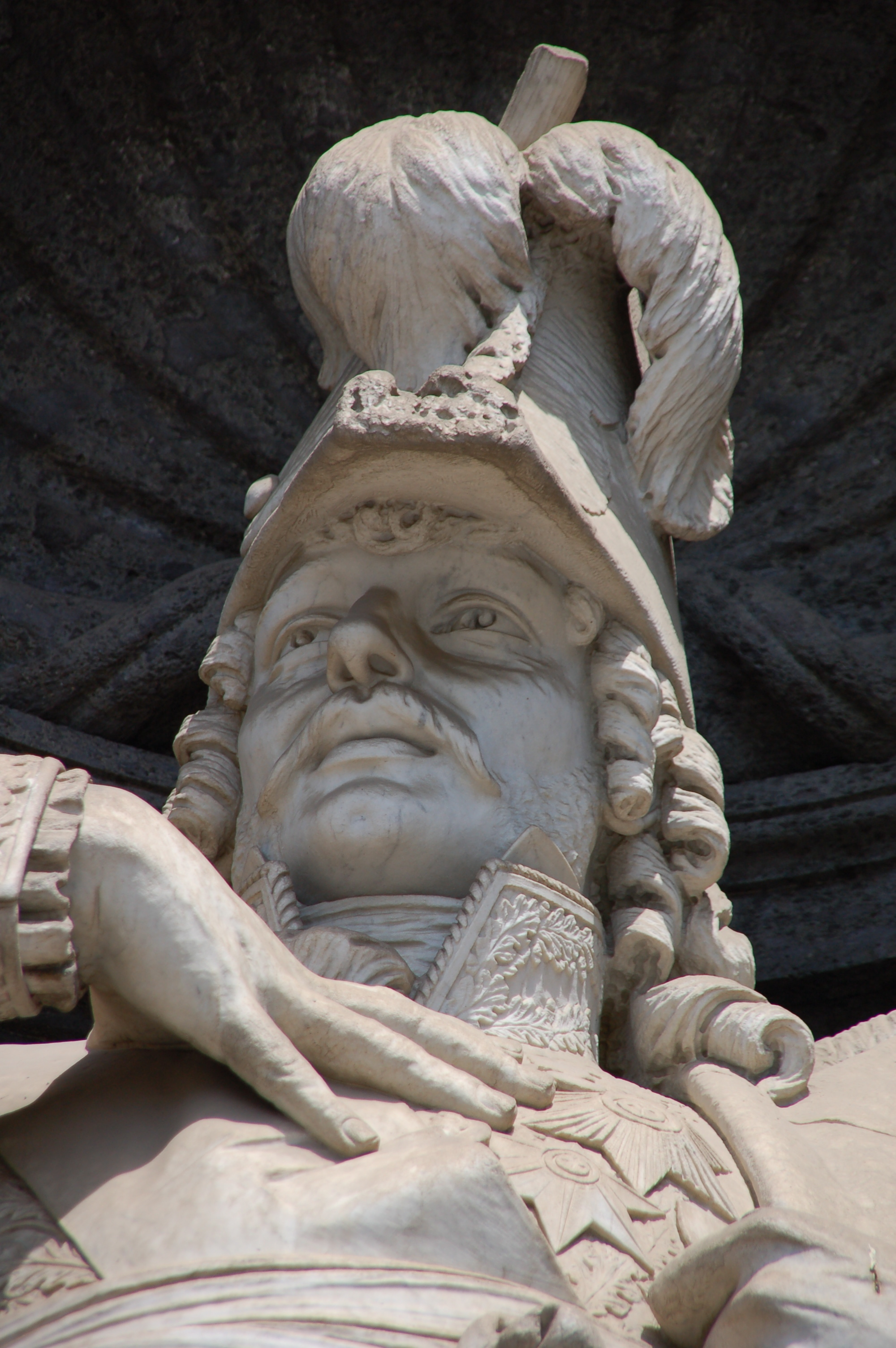
Joachim Murat.

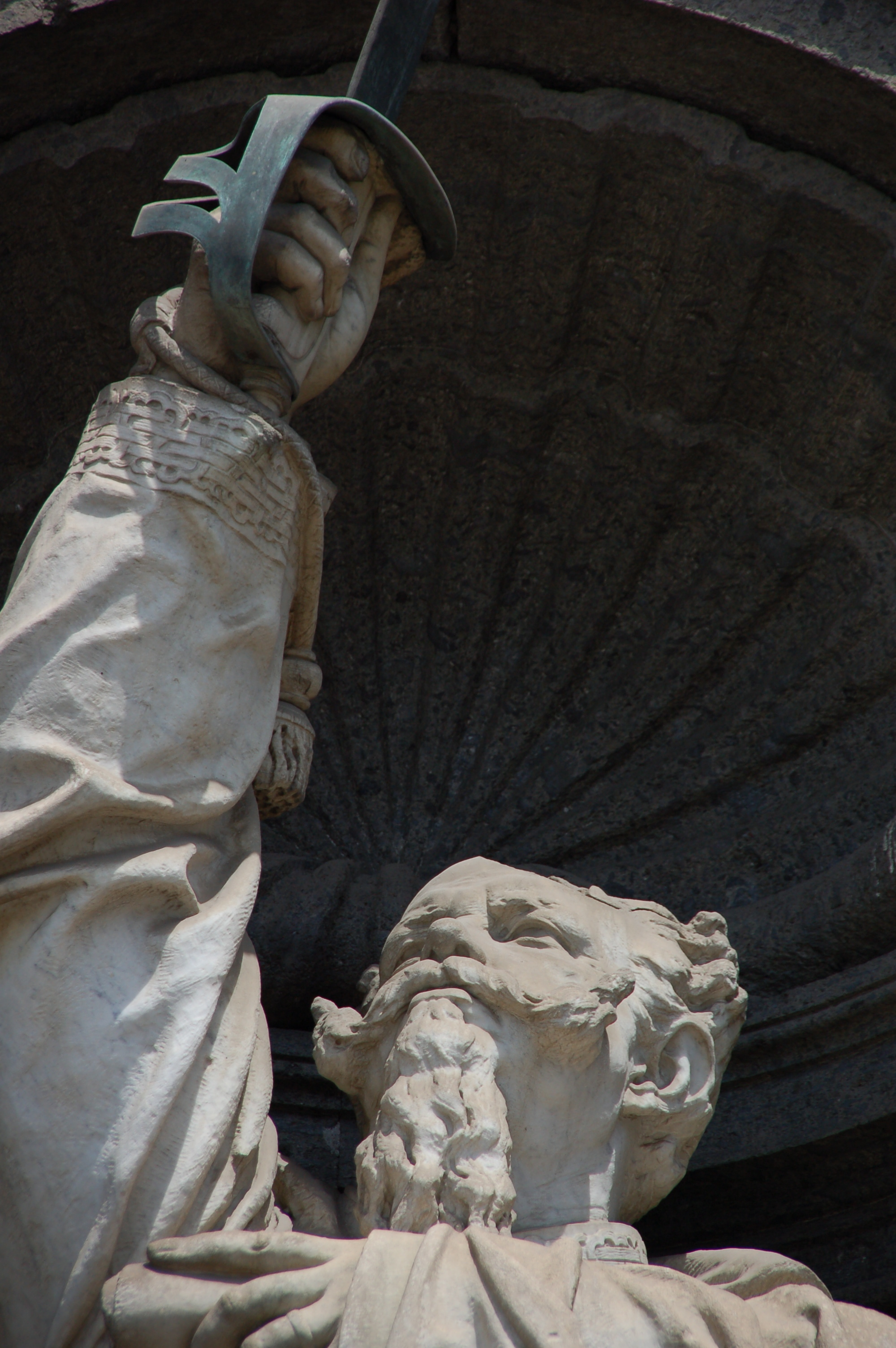
Victor Emmanuel II.

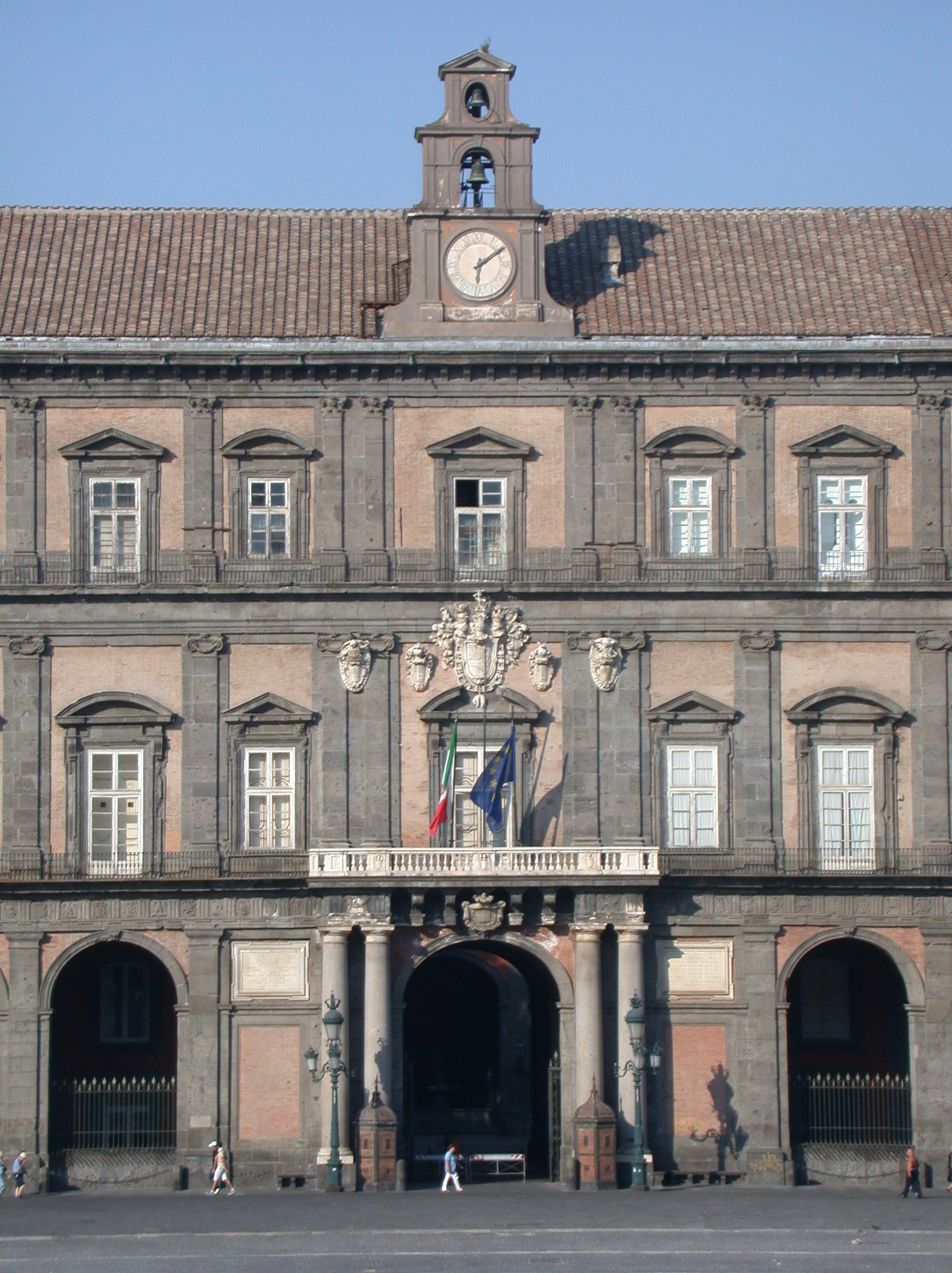
The main entrance

In the centre of the main façade is the entrance portal, flanked by two coupled granite columns, and crowned with the coat of arms of Philip III of Spain, already planned by Fontana to emphasise the public function of the palace. Next to it, on each side, are two smaller coats of arms belonging to Juan Alonso Pimentel de Herrera and Pedro Fernández de Castro, viceroys of Naples when the palace was built. Below the balcony cornice is the coat of arms of the Savoy. There are also two plaques: one in commemoration of the start of the works by order of Fernando Ruiz de Castro and his wife Catalina de Zúñiga; and the other, with an inscription praising the beauty of the building. Below the plaques there were, until the beginning of the 18th century, two statues representing Religion and Justice. The two sentry boxs on either side of the main entrance were made in the early years of the 18th century. Along the façade and in the courtyard of honour there is, between the ground floor and the first floor, a frieze with triglyphs and metopes in which are the emblems of the Hispanic Monarchy and its possessions in Europe, largely obtained after the 1559 Treaty of Cateau-Cambrésis: the three-towered castle of Castile; the rampant lion of Léon; the snake devouring a captive, symbolizing the Duchy of Milan; the shield with the four vertical bars of Aragon; the cross with the four Moor's heads, symbol of the Kingdom of Sardinia; and the emblems of Navarre, Austria, Portugal, Granada and Jerusalem.

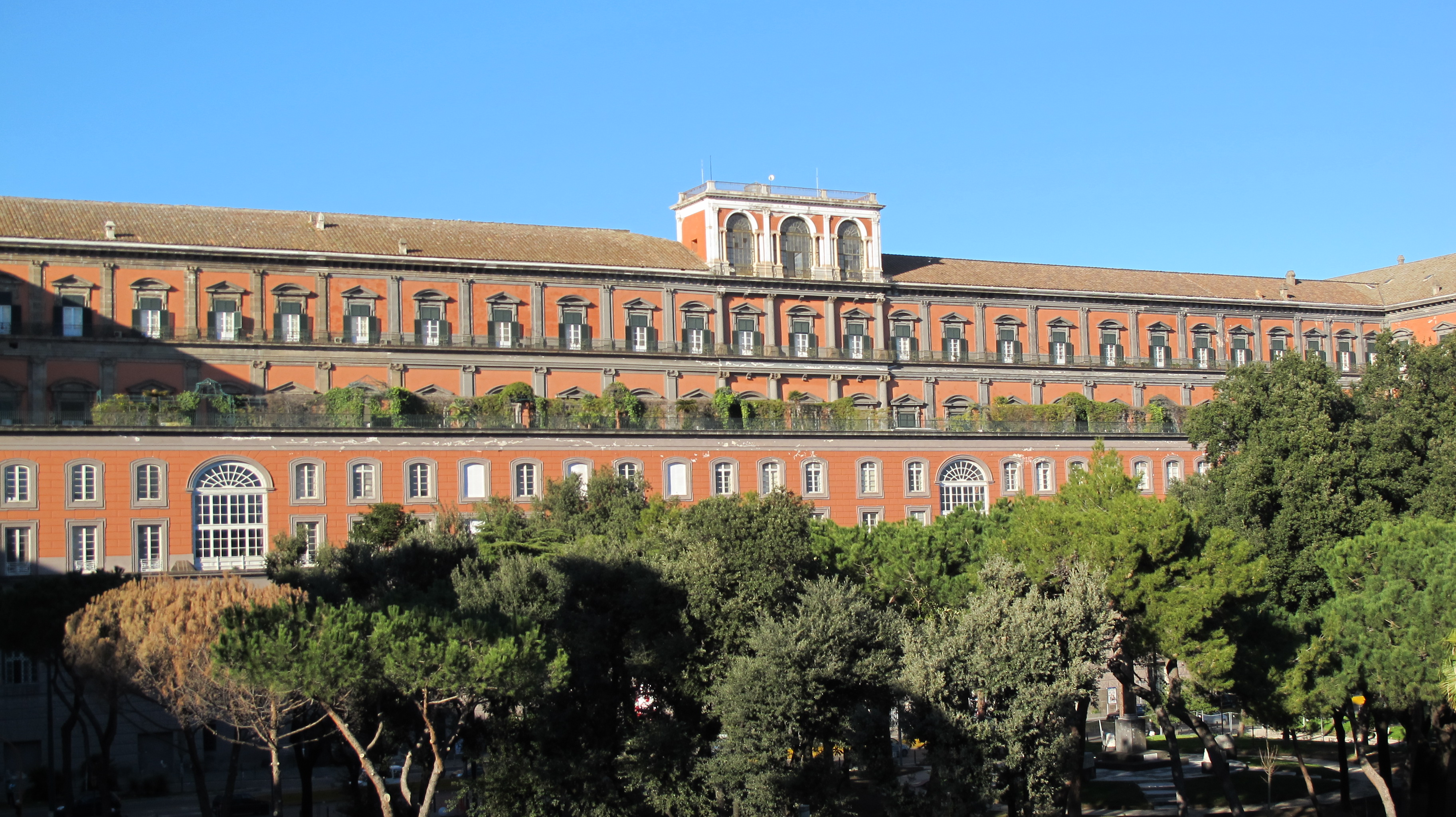
The south facade from the Via Acton.

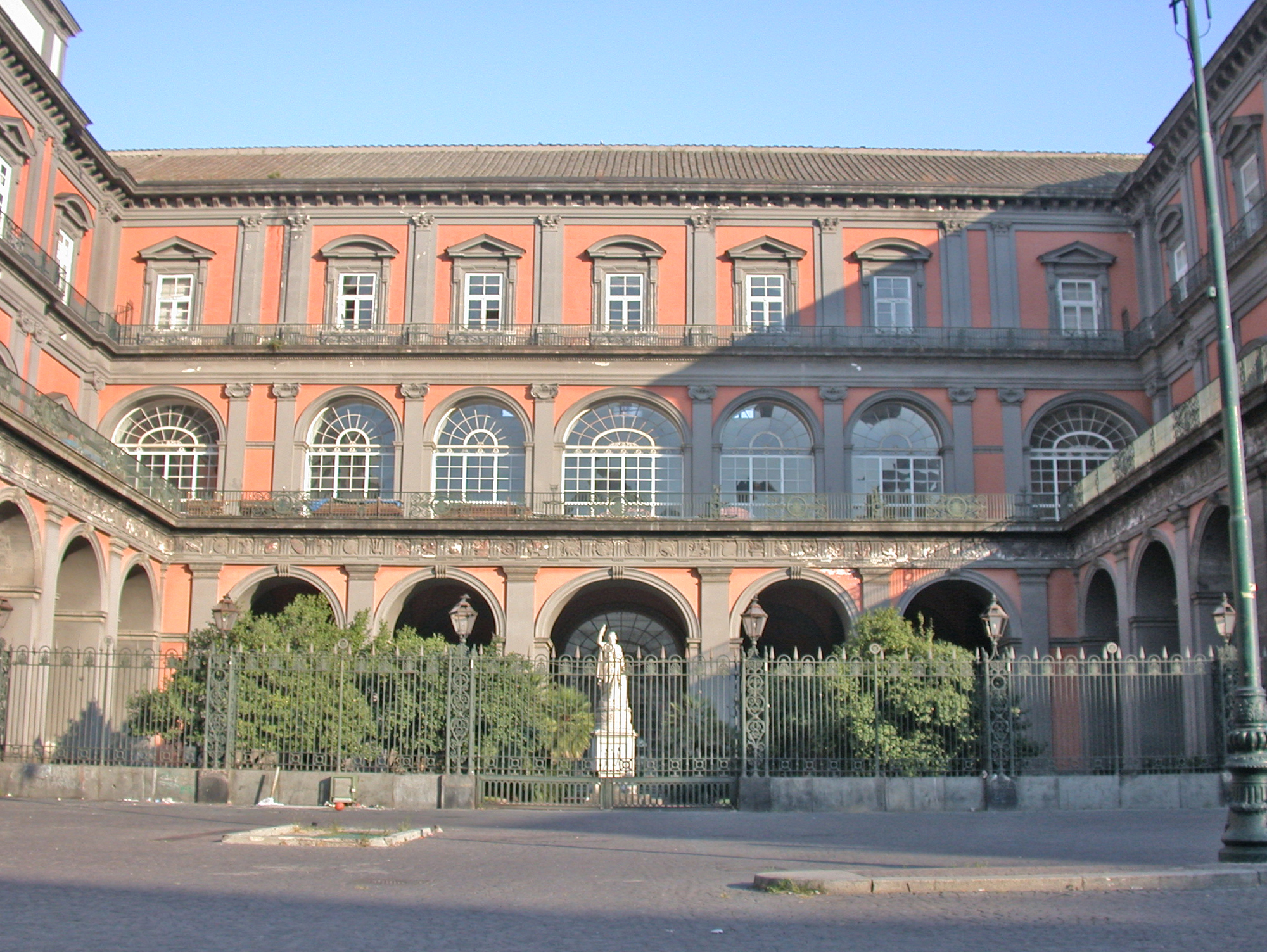
The north façade from the Piazza Trieste e Trento.

=== The other façades ===
The longest of all, the one running south along Via Acton, was built in different phases: its eastern half at the beginning of the 17th century according to Fontana's designs and the eastern half, including the central belvedere, from 1837 to 1844 by Gaetano Genovese. The north façade facing Piazza Trieste e Trento was also by the same architect, completed between 1841 and 1843 after the demolition of the Viceregal Palace. While the architects Francesco Gavaudan and Pietro Gesuè were responsible for the connection to the San Carlo Theatre.

Both façades imitate the architectural articulation designed by Fontana for the main façade, and both are C-shaped and contain a garden in their centre, the south façade the so-called Hanging Gardens and the north the Italian Garden, in the centre of which is the statue of Liberty, made by Francesco Liberti in 1861, a clear reference to the Italian unification. In addition, this north façade is partially porticoed to support a terrace. It has a glass entrance leading directly onto the grand staircase, decorated with two pairs of plaster statues from the Palazzo degli Studi and placed there during Genovese's restoration. These are copies of the Farnese Hercules and the Farnesian Flora on one side, and of the Minerva and of Pyrrhus and Astyanax on the other.

=== The courtyards ===
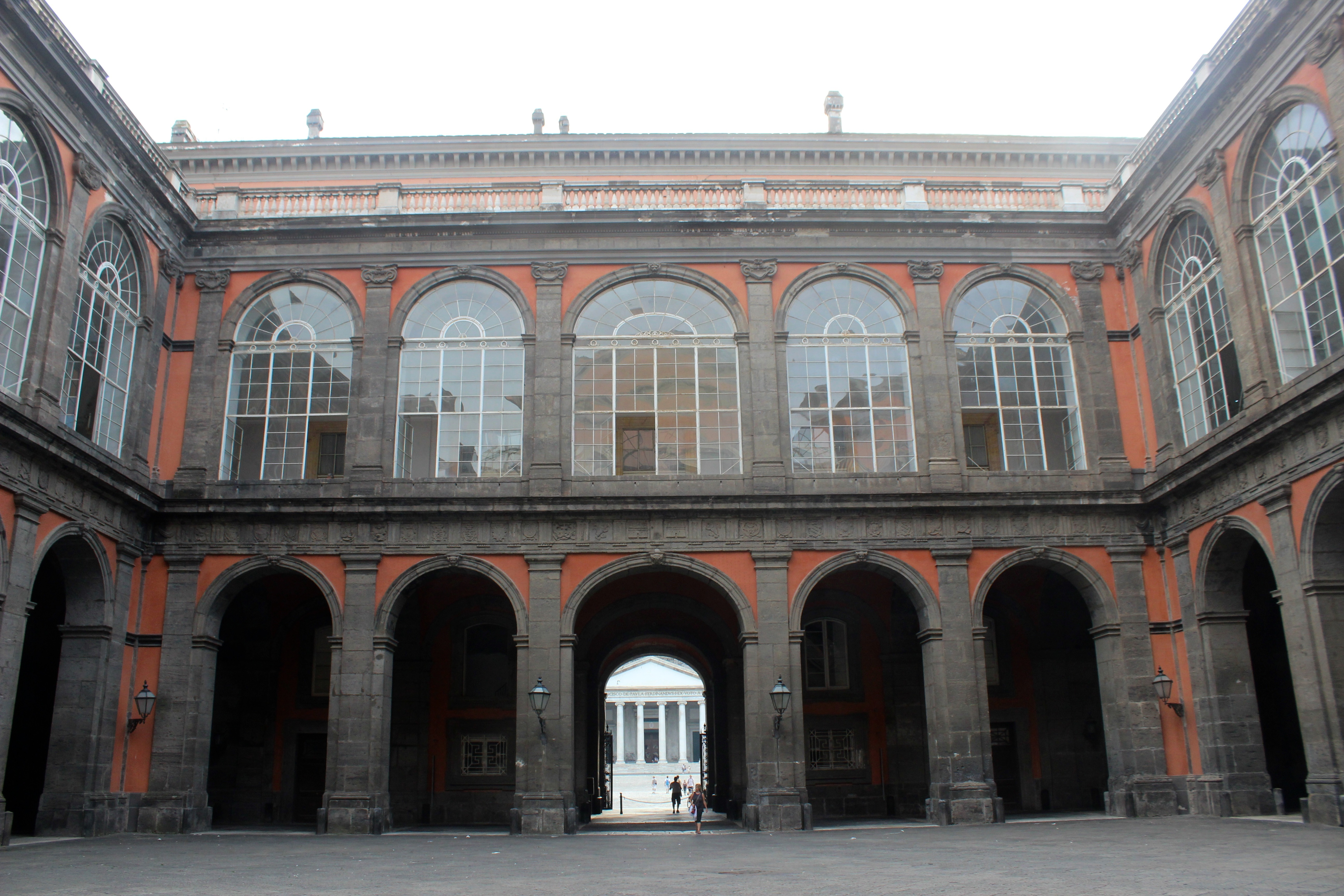
The courtyard of honour.

According to Domenico Fontana's original project, three courtyards were to be opened in front of each entrance, which would be connected to each other by vaulted corridors. However, only the central entrance courtyard was ultimately built, the so-called Courtyard of honour (Cortile D'Onore), which is square in shape, with five arches on each side. The central arch on each side is a segmental arch of larger dimensions than the others. Around the courtyard, on the first floor, there is a loggia, originally open, but which was finally closed with large windows. In a niche in the eastern part of the courtyard there was originally a cistern, which was replaced during the 1940s by a fountain decorated with a statue of Fortuna. The fountain, made in 1742 by Giuseppe Canart, was commissioned by Charles of Bourbon and was originally located near the port. Following an investigation, brick paving in the shape of a herringbone has been discovered in some places.

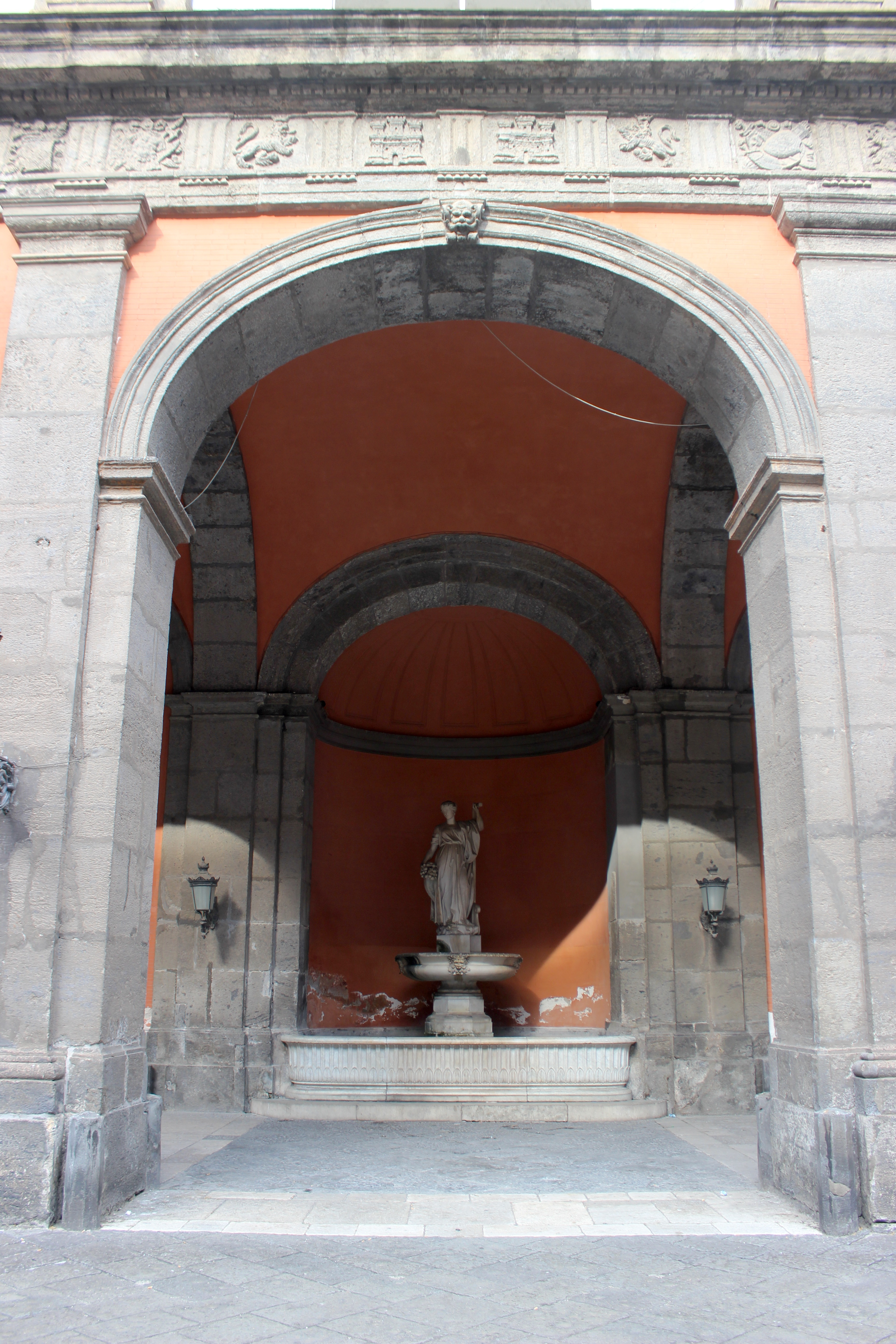
The fountain with the statue of Fortuna.

During the construction of the new southern arm of the palace between 1758 and 1760, two new courtyards were created: one on the same axis as the courtyard of honour, just behind it, which is called the Courtyard of the Carriages, while the other is the Courtyard of the Belvedere.

Despite having been built in different periods, the Courtyard of the Carriages (Cortile delle Carrozze), so called because it contained the coach houses, is architecturally close to the style that Domenico Fontana gave to the palace, although there are no lack of different elements such as the use of stucco instead of piperno and the angular pilasters. The courtyard is rectangular in shape, and has an elliptical marble cistern in the centre. It is connected to the courtyard of honour and the esplanade of the bastions by two service corridors with lowered arches. The coach house, built in 1832 by Giacinto Passaro, replaced the one existing from the previous century, the work of Ferdinando Sanfelice, mainly for aesthetic reasons, since the new one was aligned with the facade of the palace while the previous one was situated obliquely. The new coach house is a space dominated by a central line of nine columns of the Doric order, on which you can still admire red shields with the crown of Umberto I of Italy. The window layout was modified by Genovese in 1837 to adapt it to the requirements of the Belvedere Courtyard.

The Belvedere (Cortile del Belvedere) was born as a boundary towards the sea of the first nucleus of the palace and was originally C-shaped. It was closed by a loggia, which would be modified as a consequence of the construction of the new bodies of the palace in the 18th century, with the insertion of lowered arches in the eastern part. Later, the courtyard underwent modifications between 1837 and 1840, when, for access to the courtyard, a triumphal arch with Ionic and Corinthian semi-columns of false piperno was created. Between the ground and first floors, the courtyard is decorated with a Doric band with metopes, also in false piperno, and triglyphs. From the Belvedere Courtyard, you can access different areas of the palace: on the left is the Guest Staircase, which leads to the Vestibule (room XX) of the Royal Apartment and to the small bridge, destroyed in the bombings of the Second World War and rebuilt on the same supports, which links it directly to the hanging gardens. From the courtyard, you can also access a private apartment with Pompeian-style decorations, originally reserved for official meetings of Ferdinand II of the Two Sicilies, which later became the seat of the superintendency; and also to a bridge that, overcoming the defensive ditch, led to the bastion of the Castel Nuovo and to a slope that led to the stables.

== The Royal Apartments ==
The Royal Apartments (Italian: Appartamento Reale) are the part currently open to visitors and is located on the piano nobile of the western core of the palace. Throughout its history it has undergone several changes of use and name: from 1616 to 1734 it was used as the apartments of the Spanish and Austrian viceroys and their consorts; from 1734 to 1806 it was the public and private apartment of the king and queen of Naples; from 1806 to 1815 it served as the "honorary" and "ordinary" apartment of Joseph Bonaparte and Joachim Murat; It was later called the "Grand Apartment of His Majesty the King" and Ferdinand I and Ferdinand II were the last to inhabit it. After the 1837–1844 renovation by Gaetano Genovese, it was called the "Etiquette Apartment of the King and Queen" and was used only for receptions, as the sovereigns moved to the second floor of the eastern wing. In the travel guides of the beginning of the century it was simply called the "Gala Apartment", and could be visited from Thursday to Sunday from 11 a.m. to 4 p.m. upon request for a permit.

When the palace ceased to be property of the Crown and passed to the State in 1919, the Royal Apartment became one of the institutes of antiquities and art (now called Italian national museums). Its present museum appearance is due to the restoration carried out between 1950 and 1954 to alleviate the damage suffered during the Second World War, when several ceilings were damaged by Allied bombing and the silk hangings of twenty rooms were removed when the apartment was transformed into a Welfare Club (social club) for the occupying English troops.

Originally, to access the king's rooms, silver and gold keys were used, guarded by the gentlemen of the chamber, some of which are in the Museo Civico Filangieri donated by Neapolitan nobles.

=== The collections ===
The current decoration represents the tastes of the different dynasties and historical figures who have lived there, as well as different political messages typical of a building that represented the pinnacle of power in the kingdom. The reference date is the inventory made by the Savoy family in 1874, which describes the rooms after the late Bourbon modifications (1837–1844) and some slight changes introduced after the Unification in 1860.

First of all, the frescoes stand out. These essentially cover the viceregal period with works by Belisario Corenzio of Roman Renaissance inspiration or Giovanni Battista Caracciolo in a more Caravagesque line; the Baroque period of Charles of Bourbon with large allegorical frescoes with trompe l'oeil by Solimena, Vaccaro or de Mura; and finally historicist and neo-medieval works from the mid-19th century.

The paintings in the rooms also correspond to different periods, highlighting the northern and European schools of the 16th and 17th centuries from the Farnesio collection inherited by Charles of Bourbon; Caravaggesque paintings and the Dutch portraits that Domenico Venuti bought for Ferdinand I and the large court portraits of the royal family. There are also more intimate and contemporary paintings from the apartments in the east wing, such as troubadour paintings commissioned by the Murats from artists such as Louis Nicolas Philippe Auguste de Forbin or the chronicle paintings of the great moments of the reigns of Francis I and Ferdinand II by Salvatore Fergola and Frans Vervloet. However, due to the sending of the most important paintings to the Real Museo Borbonico between 1829 and 1832 and the transfer of paintings to the Capodimonte from 1862 onwards, the palace's collection of paintings today appears more scattered and impoverished than before, with its series and iconographies fragmented. In the 1874 inventory, the paintings were given special importance, together with the furniture, tapestries, flowered hangings and large neo-baroque mirrors, as creating a sumptuous atmosphere.

The furniture, in the Baroque, Rococo and historicist style, was made by Neapolitan cabinetmakers between the 18th and 19th centuries or brought from France during Murat's stay in Naples, together with carpets and tapestries, some of them woven in the Royal Tapestry Factory of Naples. Also of note are the French clocks, the porcelain, especially Sèvres, Chinese and Russian; bronze and marble sculptures and works in hard stone. Many of the exhibits come from other parts of the palace, especially the eastern wing, which was completely stripped of furniture when the National Library was installed there.

In any case, the palace does not have a real collection, but rather loose pieces, since during the 19th century, on the initiative of the Bourbons and especially the Savoys, many works were transferred to other museums (see History).

=== Floor Plan ===
The Royal Apartment is composed of a grand staircase, an ambulatory, a chapel, the hanging gardens and the Gallery and Hall of Hercules, in addition to the rooms that make up the King's apartment and the Queen's apartment.

- ██ Grand Staircase
- ██ Ambulatory
- ██ King's Apartment

1 Court Theatre
2 First Antechamber
3 Neoclassical Sitting Room
4 Second Antechamber
5 Third Antechamber
6 Throne Room
7 General's Passage
8 Ambassadors' Room
9 Maria Cristina Room
10 Oratory
11 Great Captain's Room
12 Flamingo Room
13 King's Office
29 Bodyguards Room

- ██ Queen's Apartment

14 Queen's Fourth Drawing Room
15 Queen's Third Drawing Room
16 Queen's Second Drawing Room
17 Queen's First Drawing Room
18 Queen's Second Antechamber
19 Queen's First Antechamber
20 Vestibule
23 First Backroom
24 Second Backroom
25 Third Backroom
26 Queen's Passage
27 Maria Amalia of Saxony's Bedchamber
28 Passageway
34 Queen's Boudoir

- ██ Gallery and Hall of Hercules.

21 Gallery
22 Hall of Hercules

- ██ Palatine Chapel
- ██ Hanging Gardens

Pianta

=== Grand Staircase ===
The north side of the courtyard, orthogonal to the façade, was originally occupied by a modest two-ramp staircase, the work of Domenico Fontana. However, after the anti-Spanish revolt of 1647, the viceroy Iñigo Vélez de Guevara commissioned a new and monumental staircase from Francesco Antonio Picchiatti. The new space was built between 1650 and 1670 in Piperno, and was inspired by the immense staircase of the Real Alcázar of Toledo, built by Alonso de Covarrubias and Juan de Herrera between 1550 and 1605. The new staircase, which occupied an entire side of the courtyard of honour, was built in accordance with the importance that the Austrian ceremony gave to these spaces. Montesquieu described it in 1729 as the most beautiful in Europe, however it had to be rebuilt after the fire in February 1837.

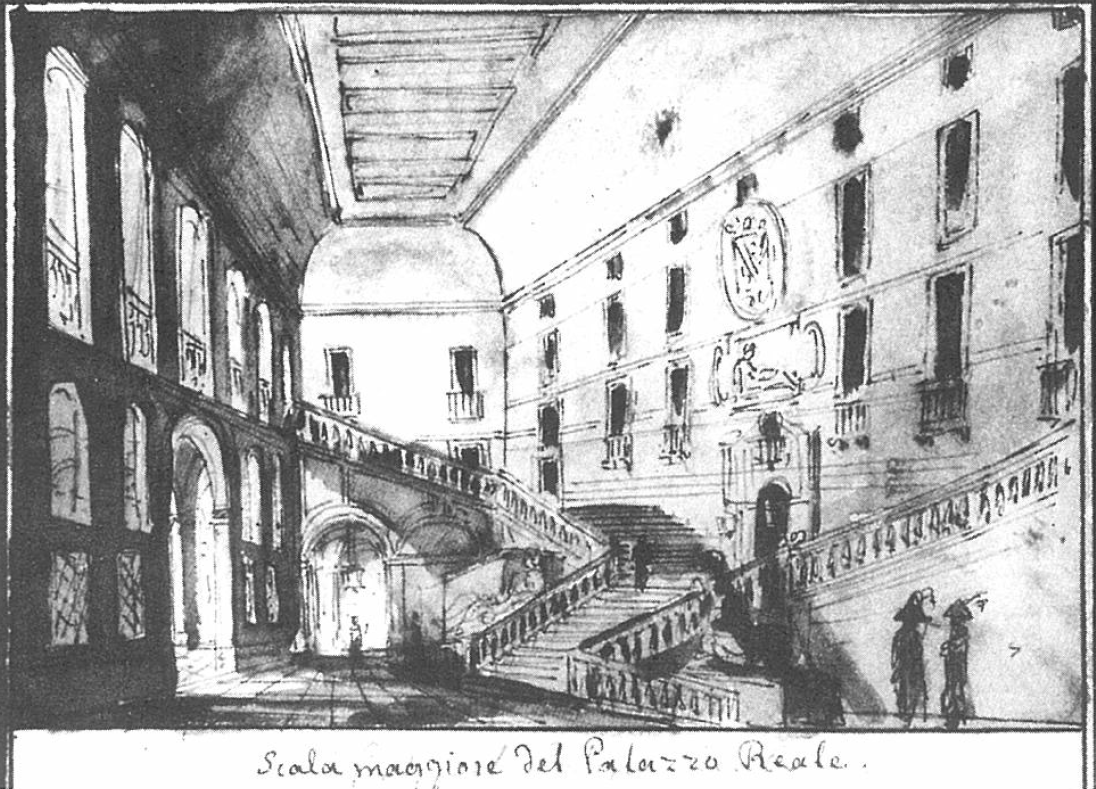
The Picchiatti staircase depicted in an early 19th century engraving by Baldassare Cavallotti.

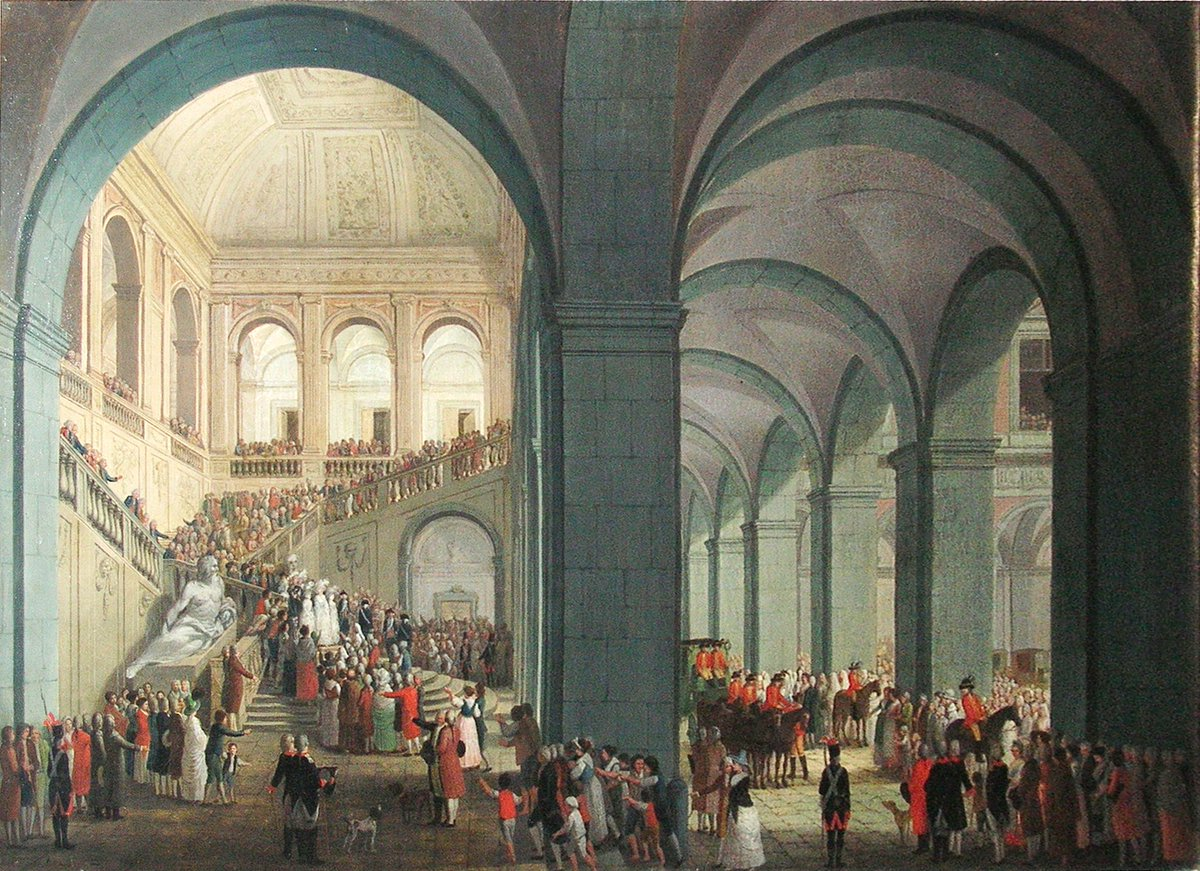
The idealised representation of Picchiatti's staircase in the painting Lo Scalone di Palazzo Reale, con le principesse Maria Teresa e Maria Luisa di Borbone painted by Antonio Dominici in 1790.

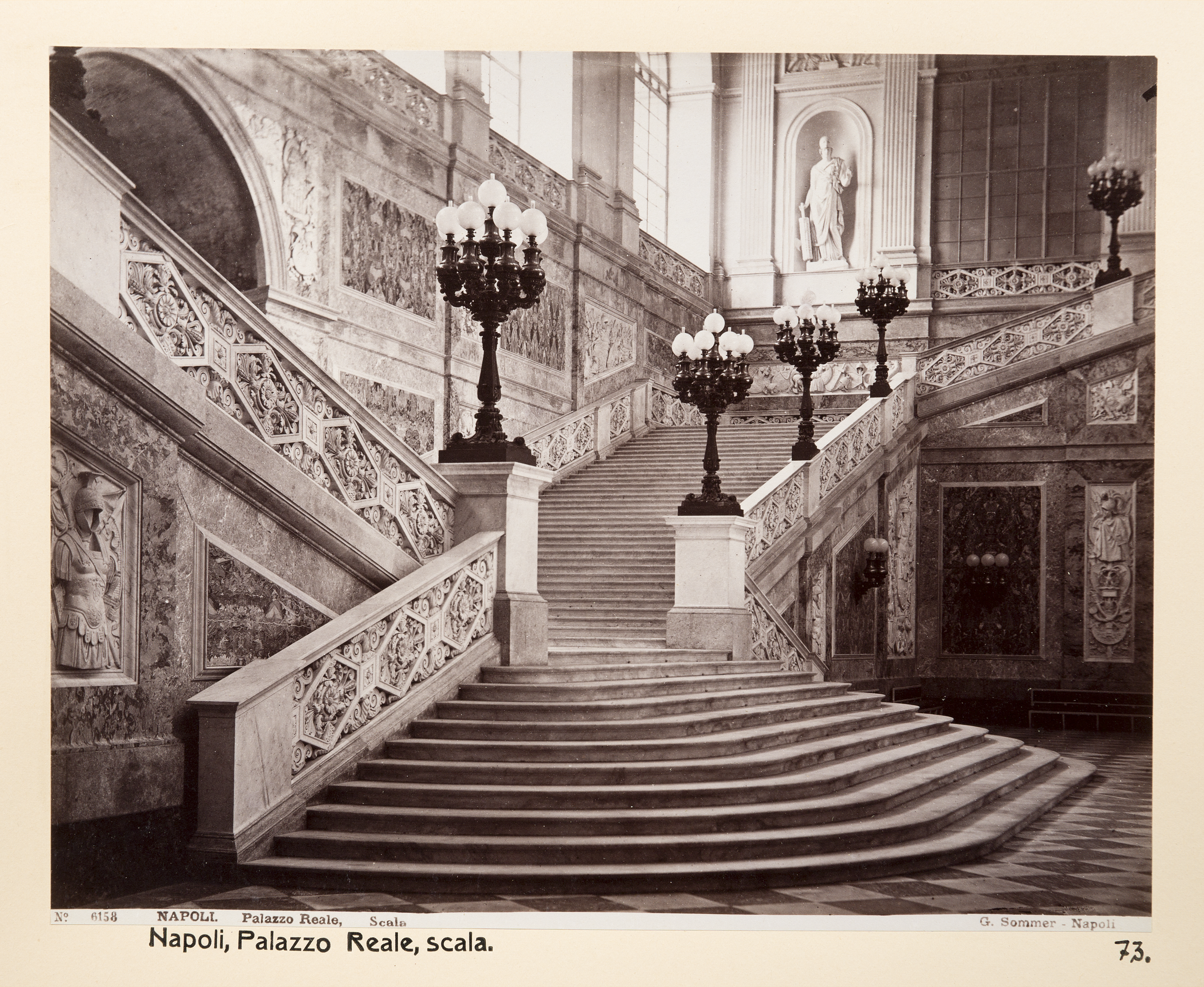
The staircase after the remodelling by Genovese and Gavaudan, with the balustrade with several torches.

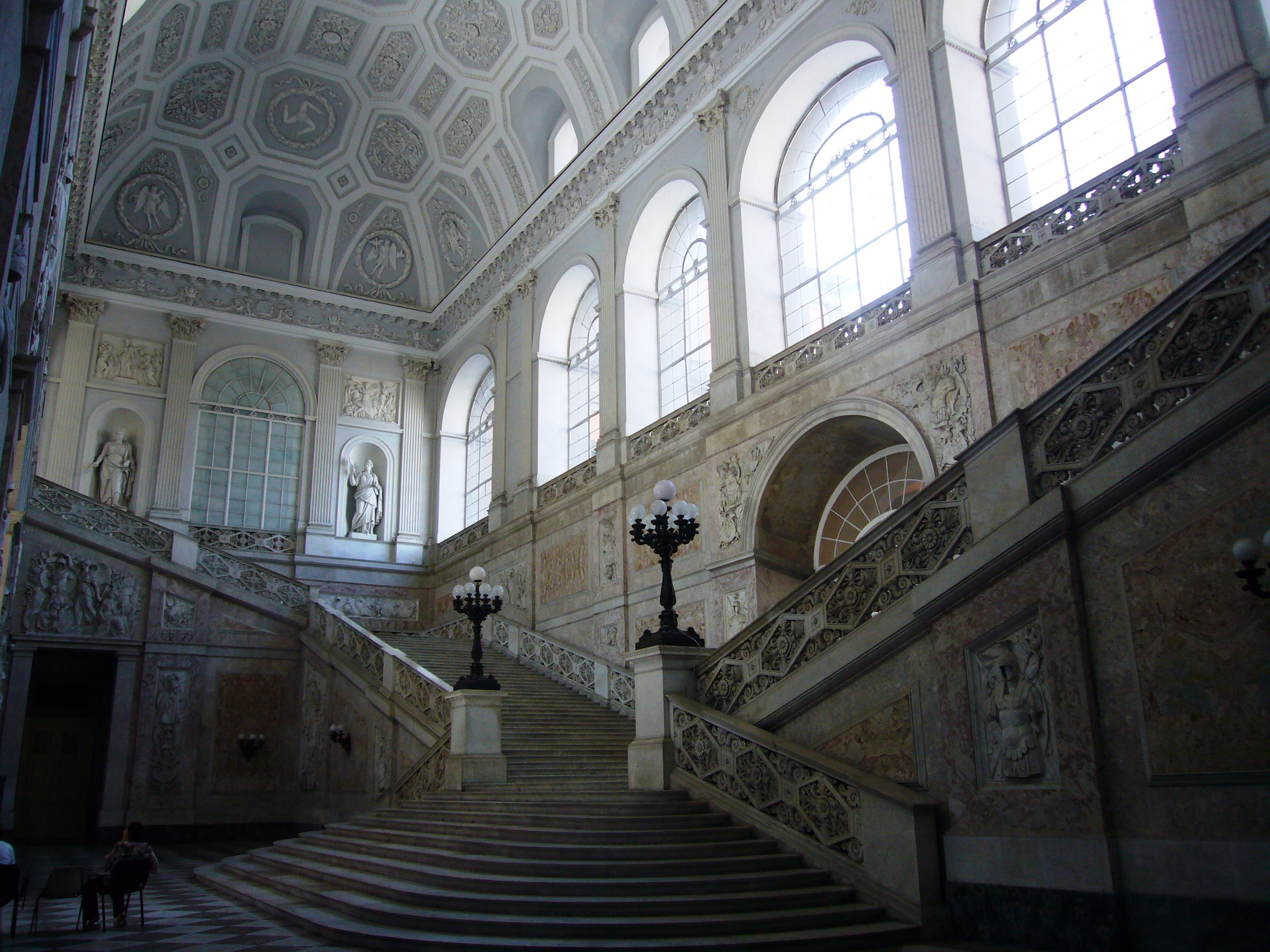
The staircase today, note the absence of several torches.

The new design in a grandiose late neoclassical style was the work of Gaetano Genovese. In 1841 the problem of the staircase's luminosity was resolved with the demolition of the viceregal palace annex, the creation of the Piazza Trieste e Trento and the opening of large iron-framed windows. However, it was not until 1858 that Francesco Gavaudan completed the decoration characterized by sumptuous marbles such as pink marble, the porto venere, the red of Vitulano, the breccia rosata of Sicily, the marble of Mondragone and the lumachino of Trapani. For its part, the cloister vault that covers it is decorated with white stuccos on a gray background, representing garlands and the shields of the Kingdom of Naples, of the Sicily, of Basilicata, of Calabria and, although it was added later, of the House of Savoy. Finally, the side walls are decorated with sculptures of the cardinal virtues: on one side, the Fortitude by Antonio Calì and the Justice by Gennaro Calì; on the other, the Clemencia by Tito Angelini and the Prudencia by Tommaso Scolari; and, flanking the central section, two bas-reliefs in Carrara marble representing the Victory between the Genius of Fame and Courage, by Salvatore Irdi, and the Glory between the symbols of Justice, War, Science, Art and Industry, by Francesco Liberti.

=== Ambulatory ===
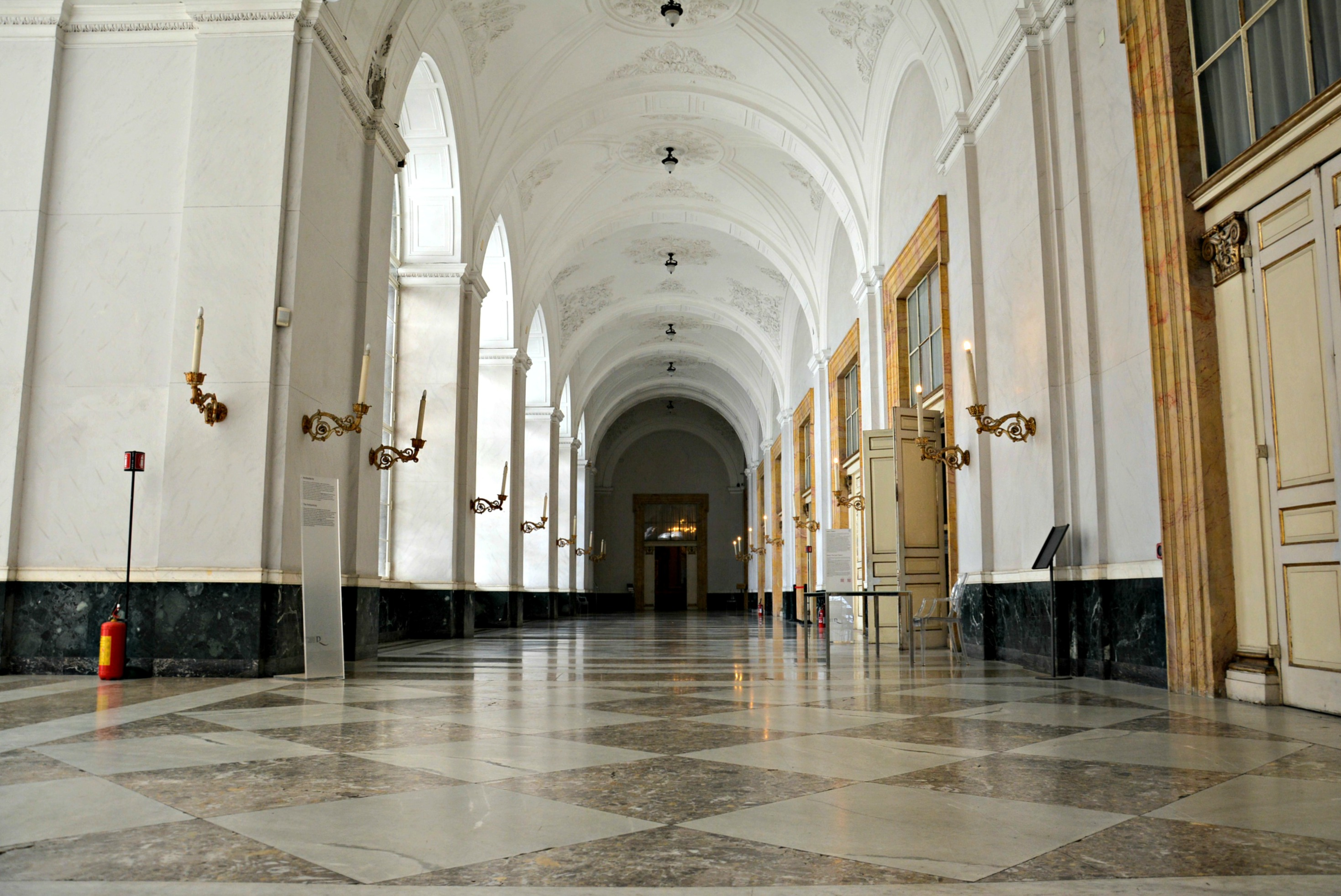
A corridor of the ambulatory.

The ambulatory on the first floor is made up of four corridors surrounding the courtyard of honour: originally it was an open loggia which, during the restoration in the 19th century, was closed off by means of large windows. At this time the vaults were decorated with stuccoes by Gaetano Genovese. The rooms of the royal apartment open off the ambulatory: in the first arm, which runs parallel to the façade towards the Piazza del Plebiscito, are the court theatre and the audience chambers; in the second are the private rooms of the former private apartment, which overlook the hanging garden; in the third, facing east, are the Hall of Hercules and the royal chapel; and finally, the fourth arm leads to the grand staircase, from which one can see through a stained glass window the Piazza Trieste e Trento, with a view, in the distance, of the Carthusian monastery of San Martino. This layout has been preserved unchanged, as it was designed by Domenico Fontana. The doors leading to the ambulatory are lacquered in white, are in a neoclassical style and were built in the 1930s.

=== The King's Apartment ===
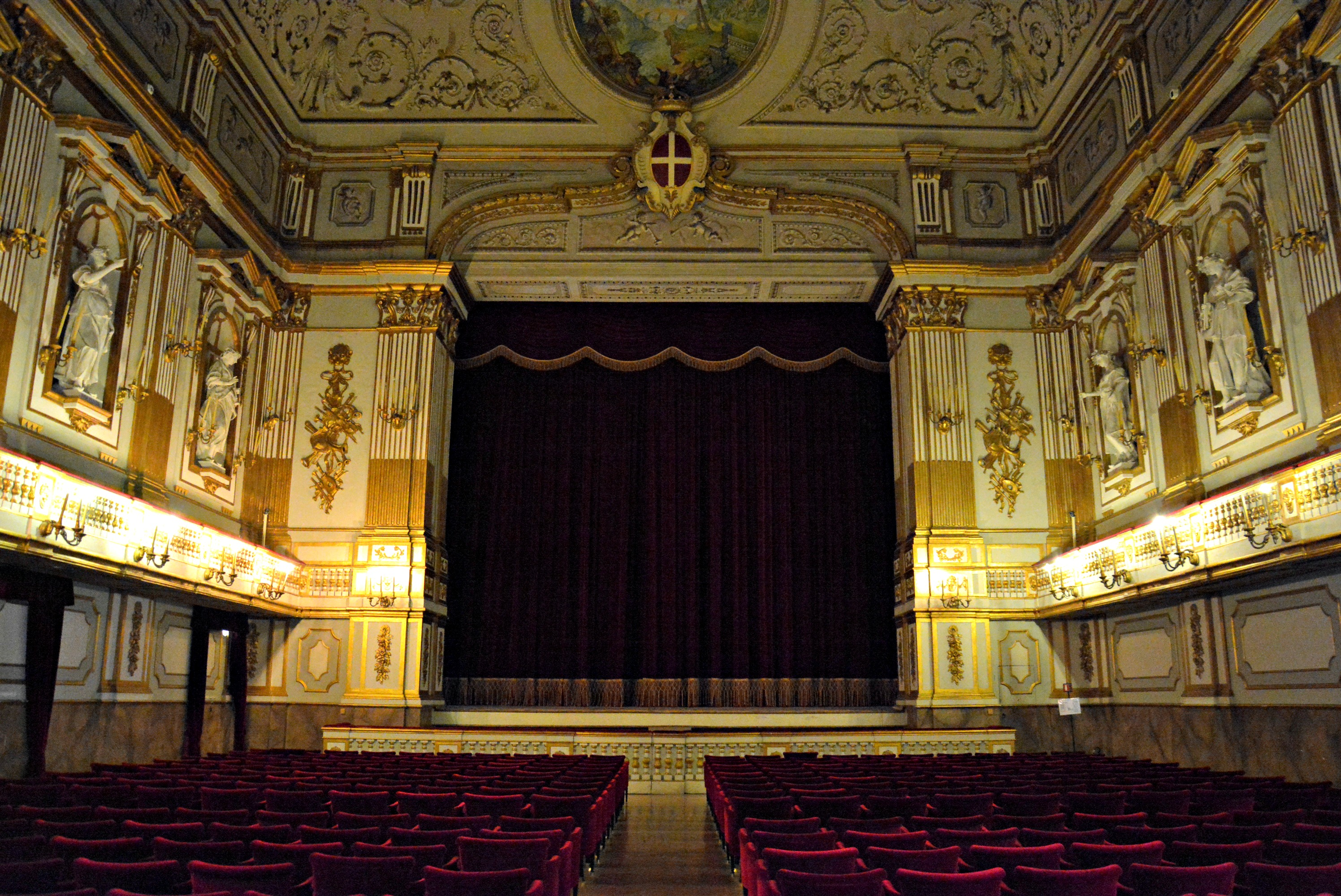
The Court Theatre.

The Court Theatre (Room I) was originally the "Sala Regia" or "Sala Maggiore" and was the largest room according to Fontana's project. From the beginning it was used for balls, comedies and festivities, and from 1648 Picchiatti decorated its ceiling with sumptuous gilded stucco and paintings by order of the viceroy Count of Oñate. This renovation ran parallel to the creation of another large ceremonial room in the palace, the "Sala de los Virreyes" (now the Hall of Hercules). During the reign of Charles of Bourbon it was regularly used for theatrical performances and a large stage was set up on it. Its current appearance, however, dates back to 1768, when on the occasion of the wedding of Ferdinand IV and Maria Carolina of Austria it was completely remade by Ferdinando Fuga in a classicist baroque style.

After the serious damage suffered during the Second World War, the stage and the ceiling had to be rebuilt between 1950 and 1954, with frescoes painted by Francesco Galante, Alberto Chiancone, Vincenzo Ciardo and Antonio Bresciani. These authors took up in their paintings the themes of the original frescoes by Antonio Dominici and Crescenzio La Gamba. In the niches there are the original cartapesta statues made by Angelo Viva, representing Minerva, Mercury, Apollo and the nine Musess.

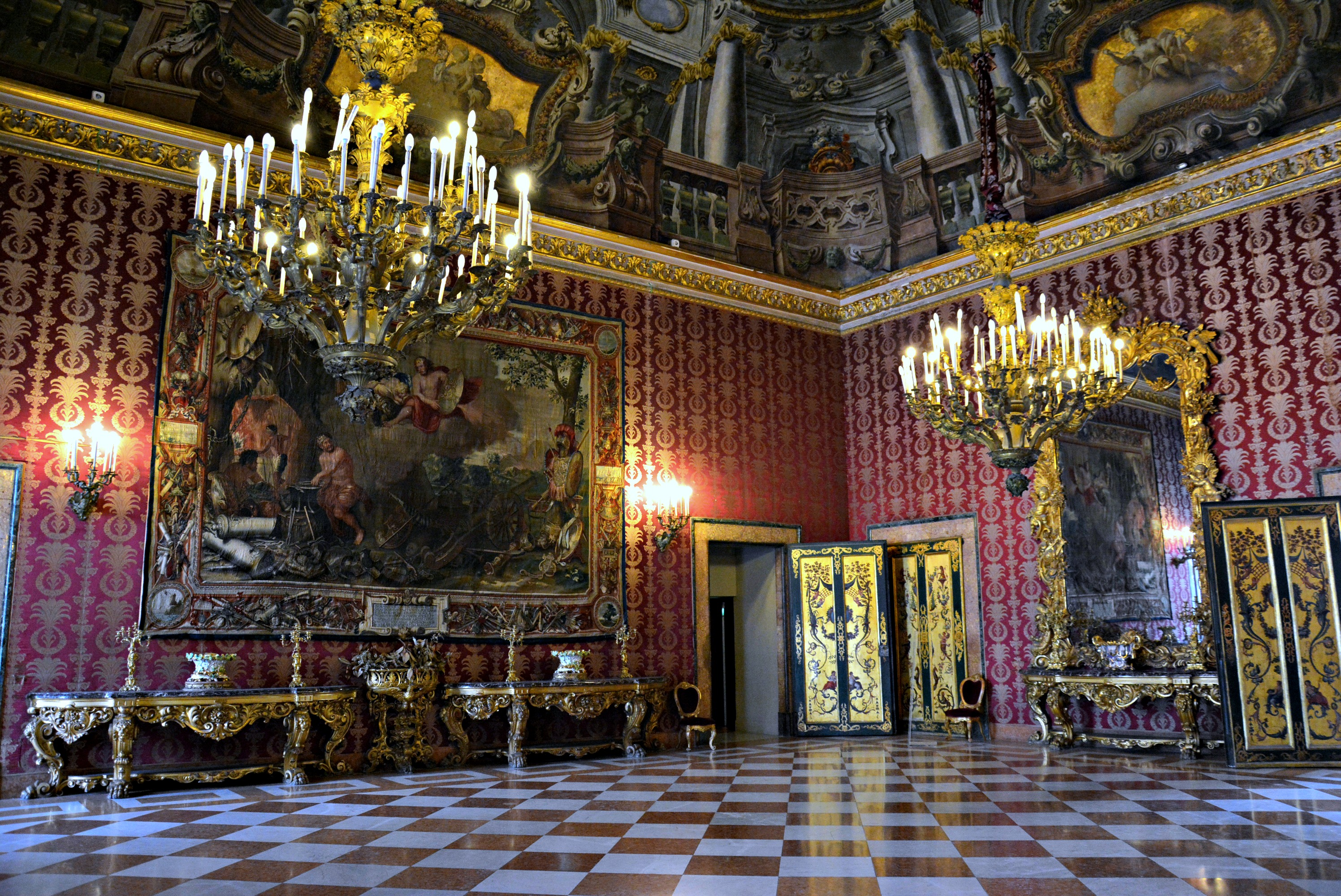
The First Antechamber (room II).

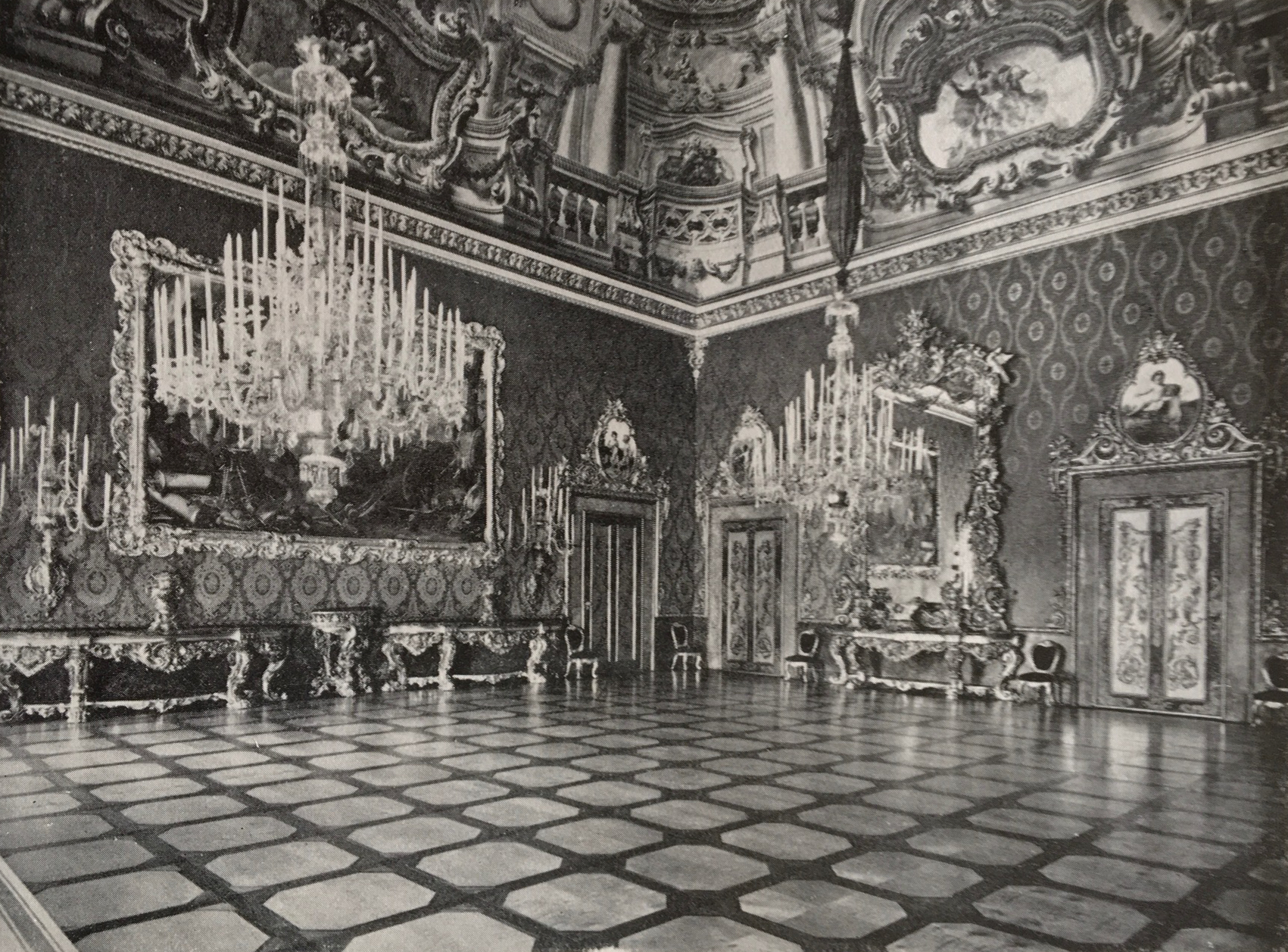
The First Antechamber with all its neo-baroque decoration before the ravages (Room II)

The First Antechamber (room II) served as the "Room of the Guard Corps" during the time of Charles of Bourbon, while during the time of the Savoy it was called the "Dining Room of the Diplomatic Corps". The most notable feature of the Carolingian period is the fresco, painted between 1737 and 1738, in commemoration of the wedding between the monarch and Maria Amalia of Saxony. Painted in a cloister vault, it was the work of Francesco de Mura, while the trompe l'oeil were by Vincenzo Re. It represents the Royal Genius and the virtues of the King and Queen (these are Fortitude, Justice, Clemency and Magnimity for the sovereign, and Loyalty, Prudence, Courage and Beauty for the queen). Also painted was Imeneo, goddess of weddings, crushing Evil. On all four sides is the Allegory of the Four Parts of the World, in monochrome, on a gold background. On an easel is displayed a fragment of the early baroque decoration of the vault, dating from 1622 to 1629 and depicting the exploits of Fernando Álvarez de Toledo, 3rd Duke of Alba. The doors, painted with tempera on a gold background, are attributed to the workshop of Antonio Dominici and were made between 1774 and 1776.

The entire decoration of the room was completely redone in neo-Baroque style in 1862 by Pietro Cheloni, being the first space redecorated in the Savoy period. Along with the large consoles and mirrors, two large Gobelin tapestries were also placed, a gift from the Apostolic Nunciature to Naples in 1719 and dedicated to the Sun King, represented through the Allegory of the Elements. However, during the Allied occupation this room was used as a performance hall for the English troops. so several decorative elements were lost, such as the parquet, the sumptuous frames of the tapestries, the wall sconces or the rocaille overdoors with medallions. The furniture is now completed by stools dating back to 1815.

The Neoclassical Room (room III), so called because of its decorative style, was designed by Gaetano Genovese. On its walls are paintings such as the Staircase of the Royal Palace with the exit of the Bourbon princesses after the wedding, by Antonio Dominici, and the Royal Chapel of Naples with the wedding of Maria Theresa and Maria Luisa of Bourbon with Francis II of Habsburg and Ferdinand III of Lorraine, an event that took place on 12 August 1790. There are also several tempera paintings on paper, made by Anton Hartinger and Franz Xaver Petter, which belonged to María Isabella of Spain. In a niche of the exedra there is a marble statue by Giovanni De Crescenzo dating from 1841 and representing a Winged Nymph.

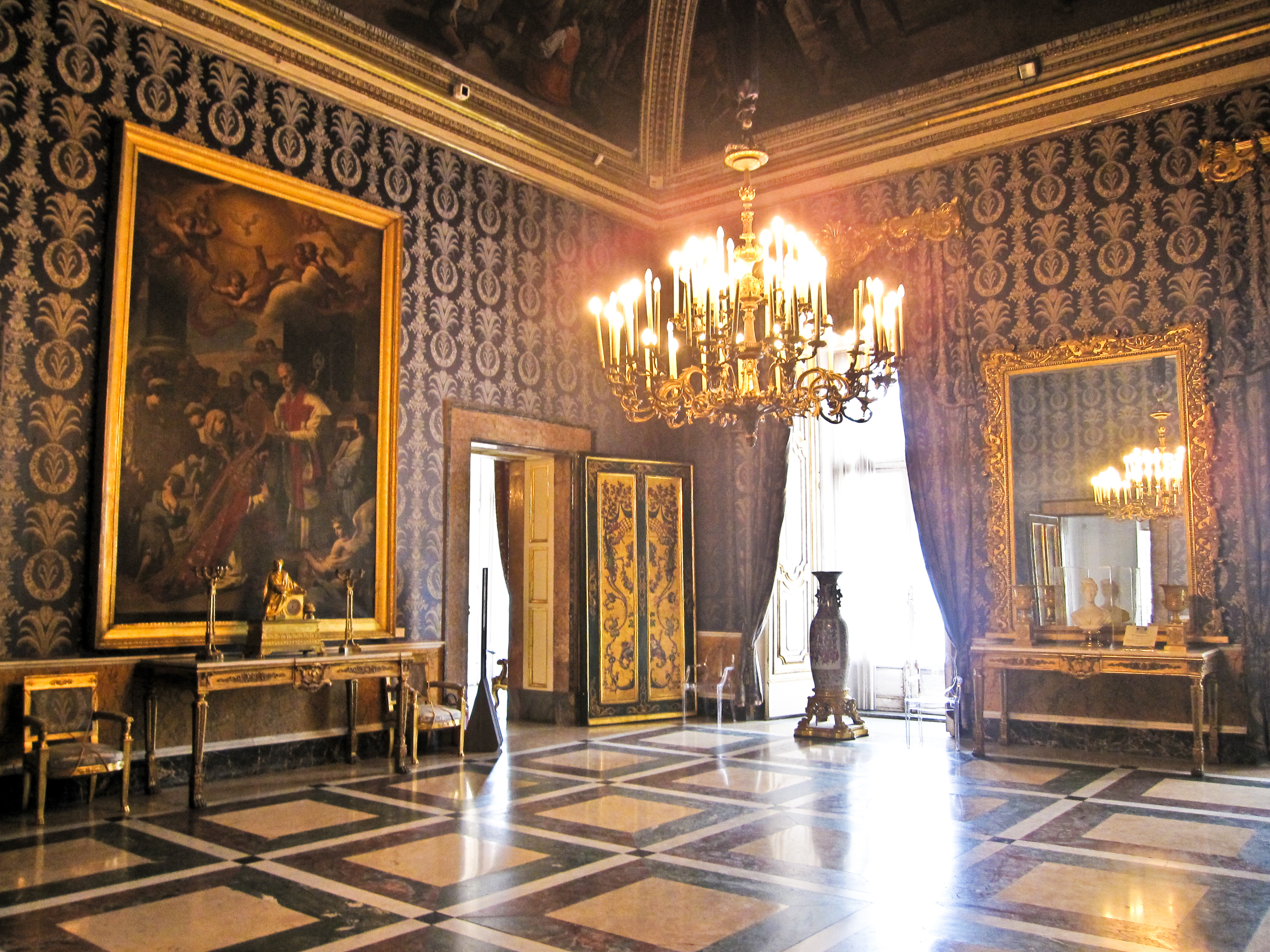
The Second Antechamber (room IV).

The Second Antechamber (room IV) was in the time of Charles of Bourbon the "Antechamber of the Officers". It preserves a ceiling from the viceregal period and mannerist style that represents the glorious episodes of the reign of Alfonso V of Aragon, (Note: The frescoes, whose titles were transcribed on the different cornices, successively represent Alfonso enters Naples, Care of the arts and letters, The city from Genoa offers the keys to Alfonso the Magnanimous, Alfonso gives the Order of the Golden Fleece to Alfonso, and Alfonso's royal investiture. The same subject can be found in some Roman palaces also built by Fontana for Pope Sixtus V, and was painted by Belisario Corenzio and his workshop around 1622.) The walls contain paintings from the Seicento, such as the Vestment of Saint Aspreno by Massimo Stanzione. The famous Pala Colonna by Raphael, acquired by King Ferdinand IV and taken into exile by Francis II in 1860, also hung there; It is currently in the Metropolitan Museum in New York. The furnishings include a console of Neapolitan manufacture from 1780, 19th century armchairs and mirrors, and other Empire style furniture brought here by the Murat family. There are also clocks and candelabra by the bronzer Pierre-Philippe Thomire and 19th-century Chinese porcelain vases, which Nicholas I of Russia gave to Ferdinand II on the occasion of his trip to Naples in 1845.

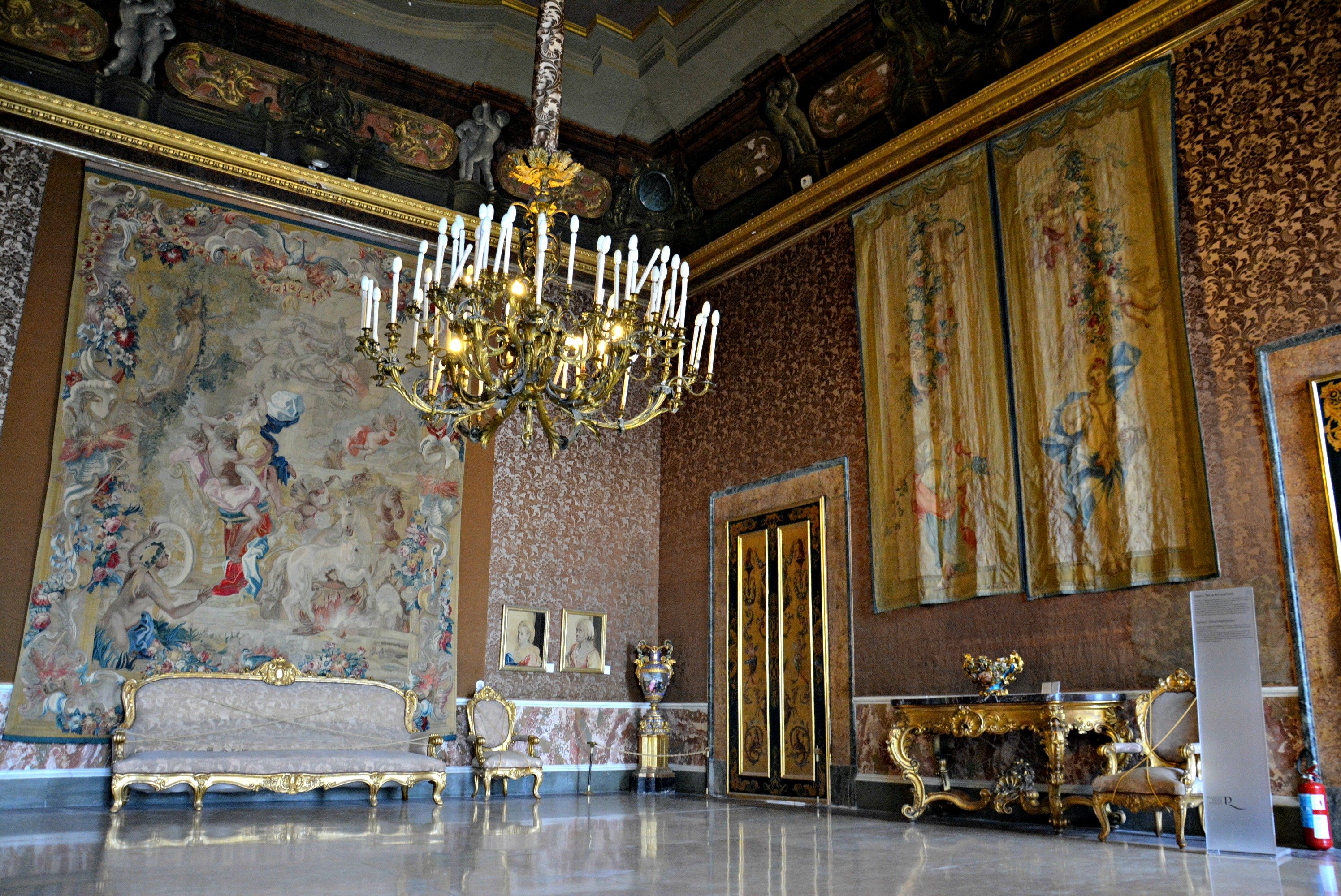
The Third Antechamber (room V).

The Third Antechamber (room V) was known in the 18th century as the "Antechamber of the Titled". Its ceiling is decorated with a fresco by Giuseppe Cammarano, Pallas Athena crowning Fidelity, painted in 1818, and referring to the restoration of Ferdinand I to the throne of the Kingdom of the Two Sicilies. The walls are decorated with a series of tapestries of Neapolitan manufacture, including the Rape of Proserpina by Pietro Duranti, made in 1762 from a preparatory cartoon by Girolamo Starace Franchis, which was recommended by Luigi Vanvitelli. This coexists with four other works, two by Sebastiano Pieroni, the Head of an Old Man and the Head of an Old Woman; one by Antonio Rispoli, Portrait of Young Women with Blue Cloak; and another by Gaetano Leurie, Figure of a Woman with Earrings. The pictorial works in the room are completed by Portrait of a Lady by Nicholas Lanier and Lot and his Daughters by Massimo Stanzione. The furniture is in the Baroque and neo-Rococo styles and consists of a console table and mirrors from the second half of the 19th century. The ornaments include French porcelain vases from the 19th century, decorated with biblical figures and dancers from Pompeii, by Raffaele Giovine, who also painted two other vases from 1842, manufactured in Sèvres, placed on small columns and decorated with scenes and floral motifs.

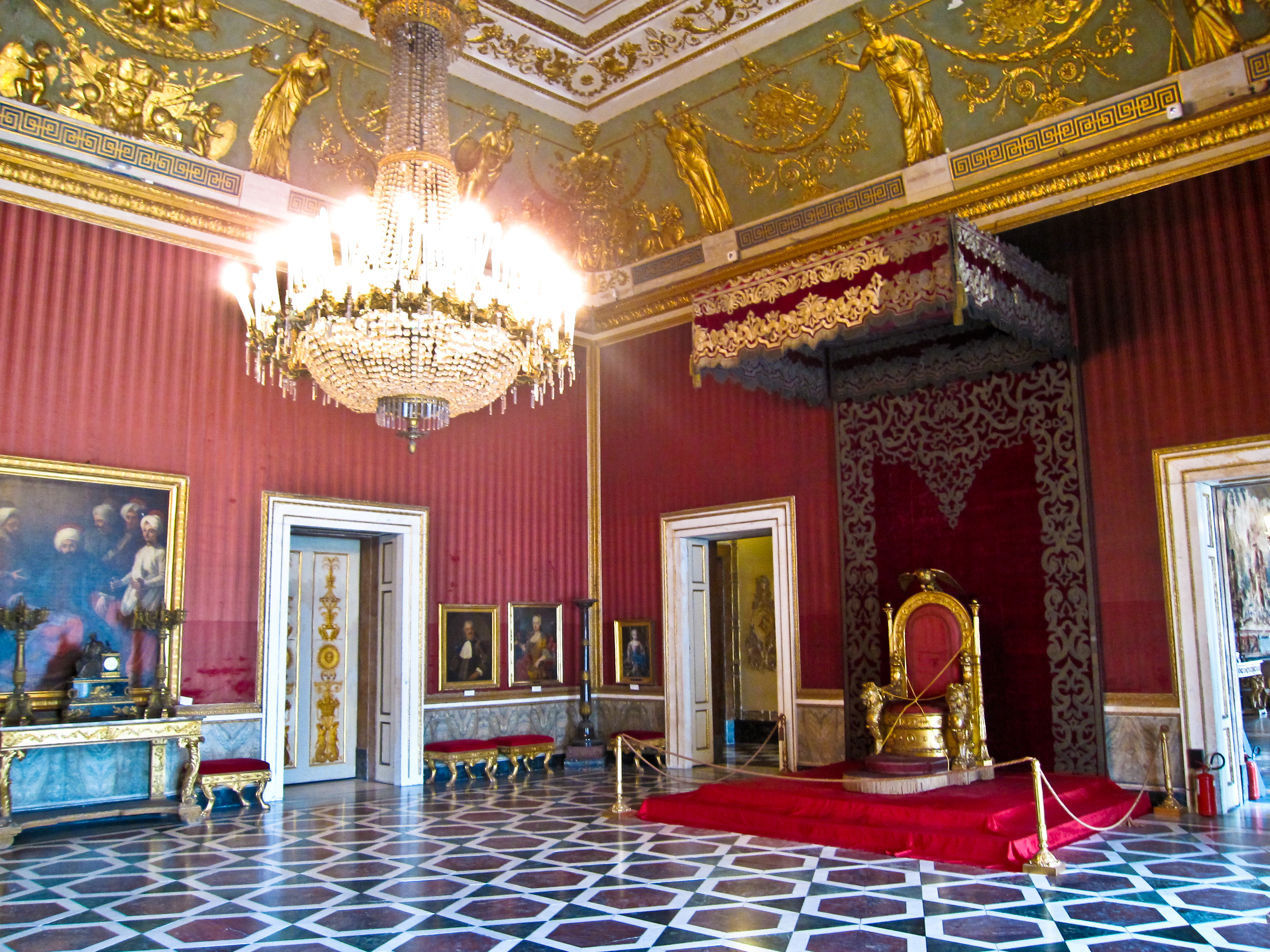
The Throne Room (room VI).

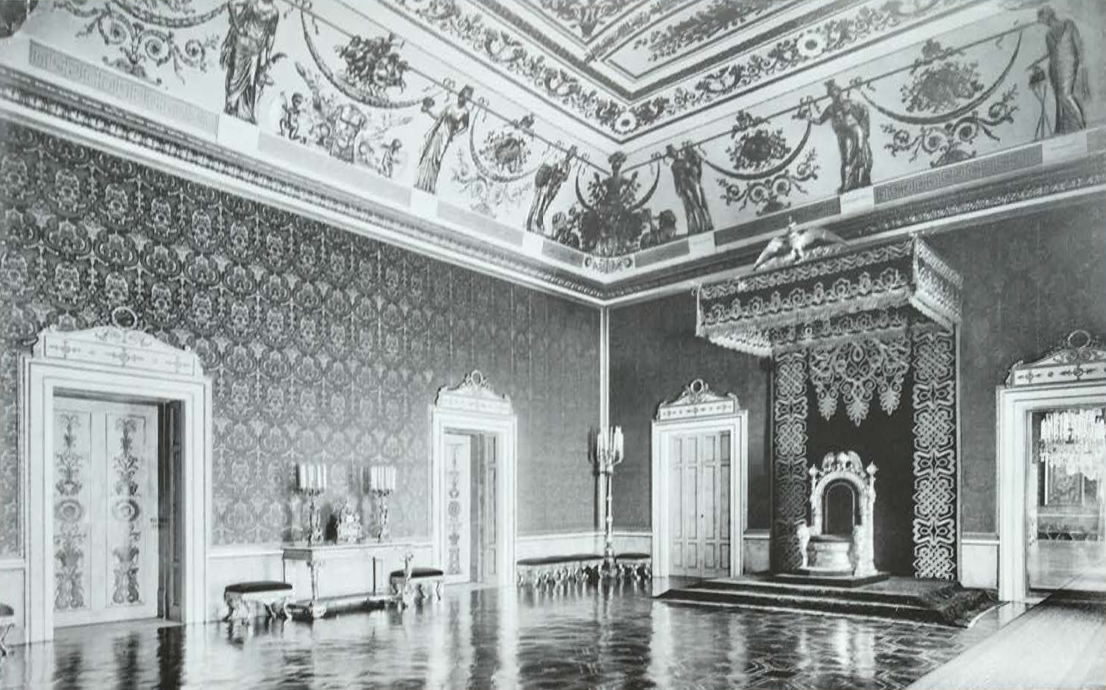
The Throne Room at the end of the century.

The Throne Room or the Room of the Kiss of Hands (room VI) underwent several decorative changes throughout its history, but its function remained unchanged (with the exception of the Muratian period). The Baroque decoration with sumptuous hangings and a large illusionistic fresco was redone in 1818, when Ferdinand I wanted to erase the memory of the French interlude by redecorating the most symbolic space of the palace. Antonio De Simone designed a new stucco ceiling by Valério Villareale and Domenico Masucci depicting the Fourteen Provinces of the Kingdom of the Two Sicilies in the form of female figures with crowns. A new hanging and a canopy of red velvet embroidered with fleurs-de-lis in gold thread were also installed that same year. All this changed radically during the Savoy period; the gilded fleur-de-lis were removed in 1862, and a new "Turin brocade" and canopy were installed in the Palazzo dei Normanni in 1877. After the brocade was lost during the Allied occupation, it was replaced by the simpler hangings of today.

The furniture, meanwhile, dates from the 1840s and was made in the Empire style in Neapolitan workshops; They are complemented by four corner torchères from the Murat period, made in Sarreguemines, and three 18th-century chairs from the gilded wood, covered with amaranth velvet. The throne, also from the late Bourbon period (1850s) and in the Empire style, imitates the throne of Napoleon Bonaparte in the Tuileries Palace, designed by Percier and Fontaine. The dominant eagle and the coat of arms of the House of Savoy were added after 1860. Due to the sumptuousness of its hangings, the Throne Room was not adorned with paintings, but since the 20th century it has displayed several royal portraits. (Note: These are: Ferdinand I dedicating the basilica-sanctuary of St. Francis of Paola by Vincenzo Camuccini; Ferdinand IV and Maria Carolina of Austria by Francesco Saverio Candido, dated around 1790 and donated in April 2008 by the Compagnia di San Paolo Foundation of Turin; a series of portraits painted by Giuseppe Bonito depicting the Turkish and Tripoli Ambassadors, who arrived in Naples between 1740 and 1741 to sign political and commercial treaties; and finally, 18th-century pastel portraits after Anton Raphael Mengs of Maria Antonia of Bavaria and Little Princesses and the Electors of Saxony.)

The so-called General's Passage (Room VII) is accessed via a corridor decorated with white and gold stucco, and was given its present neoclassical appearance between 1841 and 1845. Among the paintings on display are the Stories of Judith by Tommaso De Vivo, several paintings on religious themes by Neapolitan artists and one by François Marius Granet. In the room there is a statue in mahogany and bronze by the artist Thomire, which belonged to Caroline Bonaparte and represents Psyche. The furniture consists of a 19th-century English-made stool, with legs shaped like a lion's claw and decorated on the front with reproductions of shells.

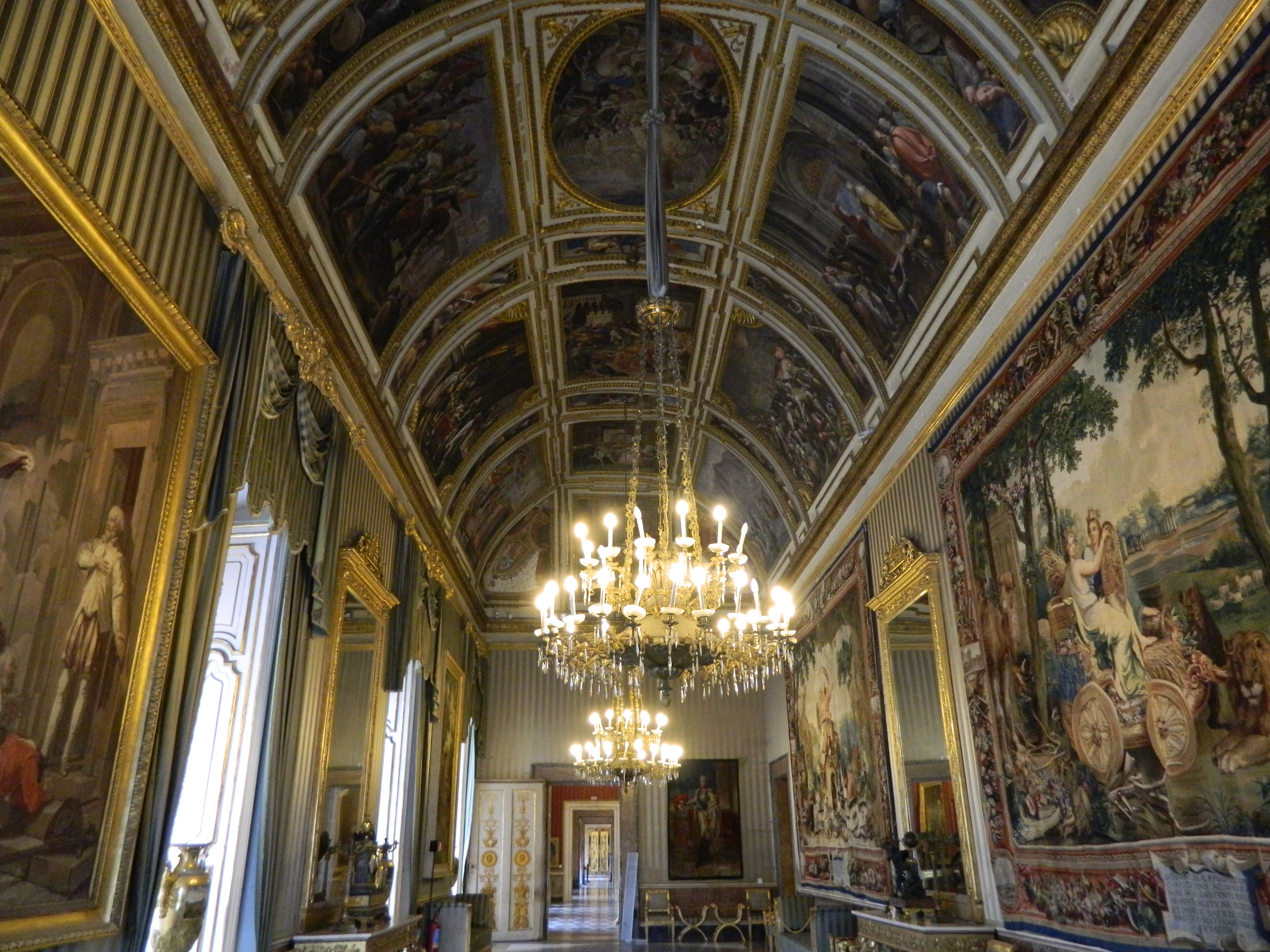
The Ambassadors' Hall (room VIII).

The Ambassadors' Hall (room VIII) was a transitional space between the reception rooms facing the square and the private rooms facing the sea. Here the ambassadors waited to be received by the monarch in the next room. It was conceived as a French-style Appartement, that is, a space where the owner exhibited his most precious art collections. However, it was a restricted space, which in the viceregal era was used for the meetings of the most important governing body, the Collateral Council. The ceiling paintings date from that period, inserted in fourteen compartments surrounded by gilded stucco and representing the great moments of the House of Austria and several episodes from the life of Ferrante of Aragon. (Note: The frescoes are: Departure of Mariana of Austria from Final Ligure, Entry of Mariana of Austria into Madrid, Marriage of Mariana of Austria with Philip III of Spain, War against Louis XII of France, The Spanish rescue Genoa, besieged by the French, War against Alfonso of Portugal, Battle against the Moors in the mountains of La Alpujarra, Battle against the Moors of Granada, Conquest of the Canaries, Triumphal entry of Ferrante of Aragon into Barcelona, Expulsion of the Jews from Spain, Oath of loyalty of the Sicilians to Ferrante, Discovery of the New World and Meeting of Saint Francis of Paola with Ferrante of Aragon) These paintings, executed in the third decade of the 17th century, are attributed to Belisario Corenzio and his workshop, with the assistance of Onofrio and Andrea di Lione; except those dedicated to Mariana of Austria, attributed to Massimo Stanzione, and after 1640. In the four corners of the ceiling are the Bourbon shields, although during the restorations the emblems of Fernando Ruiz de Castro, patron of the work, appeared below them.

Originally the room was decorated with a large number of paintings, however between 1829 and 1832 a large part of the palace's ancient painting collection was sent to the Real Museo Borbonico, then the room was covered with a blue hanging (now in the Second Antechamber) and four tapestries: Allegory of the Sea and Allegory of the Earth by Louis Ovis de la Gira; and two other Gobelins with the History of Henry IV dating from 1790 and acquired as a model for a series of tapestries destined for the Royal Palace of Carditello. The furniture is in the Empire style of 1840 and two clocks from the Napoleonic period stand out, decorated respectively with the Allegory of Time and the Genius of the Arts.

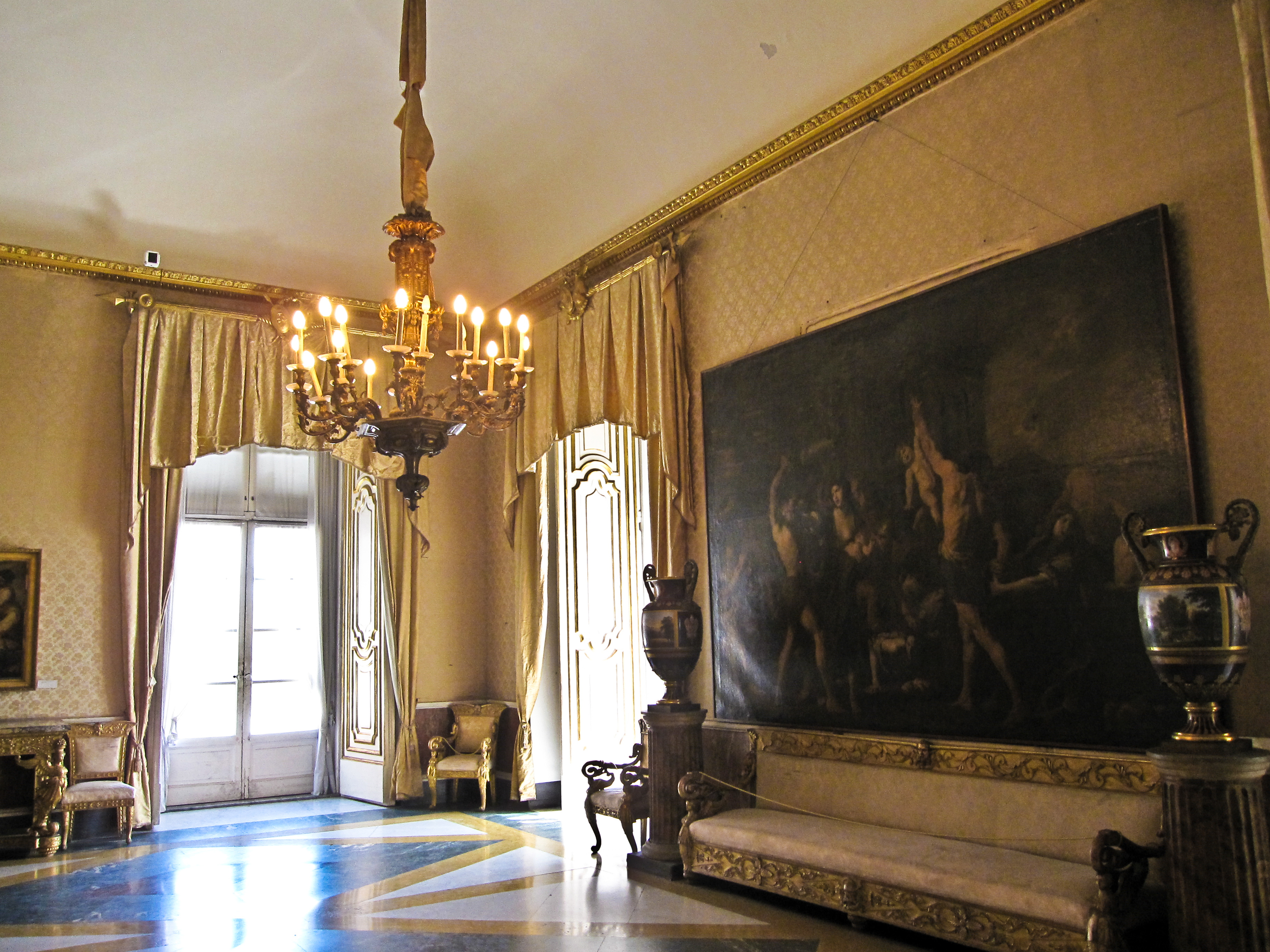
The Maria Cristina Room (room IV).

The now called Maria Cristina Room (room IX) in honour of the first wife of Ferdinand II, was during the time of Charles of Bourbon the "Room where His Majesty dresses", while during the French period it was the "Room à léver", it was therefore a semi-public space intended for morning receptions or levers. In addition, it allowed access to the king's private apartments in the Belvedere Wing and the hanging garden. After the reform of 1837–1844 it lost its residential use and became the "Council Hall". Originally, it was decorated with a fresco by Nicolo Maria Rossi from 1737 depicting the Siege of Gaeta (1734), but in 1763 the vault had to be rebuilt due to structural problems and a new fresco of The Chariot of Aurora by Francesco de Mura was made. Unfortunately, this was lost during the bombings and the Allied occupation of Naples (1943–1946).

The paintings that decorate the room are of sacred themes and date from the 16th and 17th centuries, such as Virgin and Child and Virgin and Child and Saint John, attributed to Pedro de Rubiales, who was inspired for their creation by the work of Filippino Lippi; Circumcision of Jesus, by the school of Ippolito Scarsella; and Massacre of the Innocents, by Andrea Vaccaro. The furniture dates from around 1840 and among the ornaments are two Sèvres porcelain vases decorated by Jean-Baptiste-Gabriel Langlacé with Seasons, given by the Duchess of Berry to her father Francis I in 1830. There are also two clocks, one with the image of an African Woman, from 1795, and another with portraits of John II of France and Philip the Bold.

The former Rey's private oratory (room X), is a small room located next to the Maria Cristina Room. On its walls are displayed five paintings from 1760, from the royal chapel of Capodimonte. All of them have the Nativity as their theme, and were the work of Francesco Liani, court painter during the reign of Charles of Bourbon. In the center of the room is a wooden altar from the 19th century and behind it the silver-plated copper sarcophagus of Maria Christina of Savoy, who died in 1836 giving birth to the future Francis II, was buried in the basilica of Santa Chiara and later beatified.

The Hall of the Great Captain (room XI) owes its name to the fresco cycle Stories of Gonzalo de Córdoba by Battistello Caracciolo, which has as its theme episodes of the Spanish conquest of the kingdom of Naples by Gonzalo Fernández de Córdoba, called the Great Captain. During the 18th century, this room, which had no windows, served as a bedroom for the king's valet. The paintings on the walls come from the Farnese collection and among them stands out Pier Luigi Farnese, attributed to Titian, a series of figurative epigrams by Otto van Veen, and a tapestry with the Allegory of Chastity from the series of Conjugal Virtues. (Note: The series devised by Luigi Vanvitelli and Ferdinando Fuga was based on cartoons, currently in the Palace of Caserta, made by important painters of the time: the Allegory of Religion by Pompeo Batoni; the Allegory of Innocence and the Allegories of Charity and Generosity by Giuseppe Bonito; the Allegories of Justice and Peace by Stefano Pozzi; the Allegories of Fortitude and Vigilance by Corrado Giaquinto and the Allegory of Modesty by Francesco de Mura. The tapestries were woven from 1763 to 1767 with silver and silver-gilt threads by Pietro Duranti at the Royal Tapestry Factory of Naples and were intended for the bedroom of Ferdinand IV in the now-disappeared Belvedere wing.)The furniture dates from the 18th century and includes consoles and sofas in the Louis XVI style, carved by Neapolitan craftsmen.

The so-called Flamingo Room (room XII) was, like the previous room, a dark space with no direct lighting in the 18th century, served as a rear antechamber. With the renovations of the mid-19th century it was converted into a reception area and in 1840 Gennaro Maldarelli painted on the ceiling Tancred returns Constance to the Emperor Arrigo VI following a neo-Gothic aesthetic with references to the ancient history of Sicily. The ceiling is surrounded by elaborate stuccos from the same period with coats of arms of the four Neapolitan provinces. The room is named after the numerous Flemish paintings from the 17th century that adorn it. (Note: Among the works on display are Portrait of a Flute Player by Alexis Grimou; Portrait of a Gentleman by Bartholomeus van der Helst; Portrait of a Maid by Ludolf de Jongh; The Avaricious, from the Farnese collection, by Marinus van Reymerswaele; Canoniguess by Nicolaes Maes; Portrait of Oliver Cromwell by an unknown artist from the 18th century; Portrait of a Gentleman, Portrait of a Lady and Portrait of a Magistrate, all by Abraham van den Tempel; and Portrait of a Cardinal, attributed to Giovan Battista Gaulli.) and which were purchased by Domenico Venuti for Ferdinand IV in 1802 in Rome. Among the furniture ornaments are a 1730 clock by Charles Clay, with a mechanical barrel organ inside capable of producing ten different tones; and a jardinière table with views of Russian residences and a birdcage made by the Popov factory in Gorbunovo in Moscow, which was given to Ferdinand II during Tsar Nicholas I's trip to Naples in 1846.

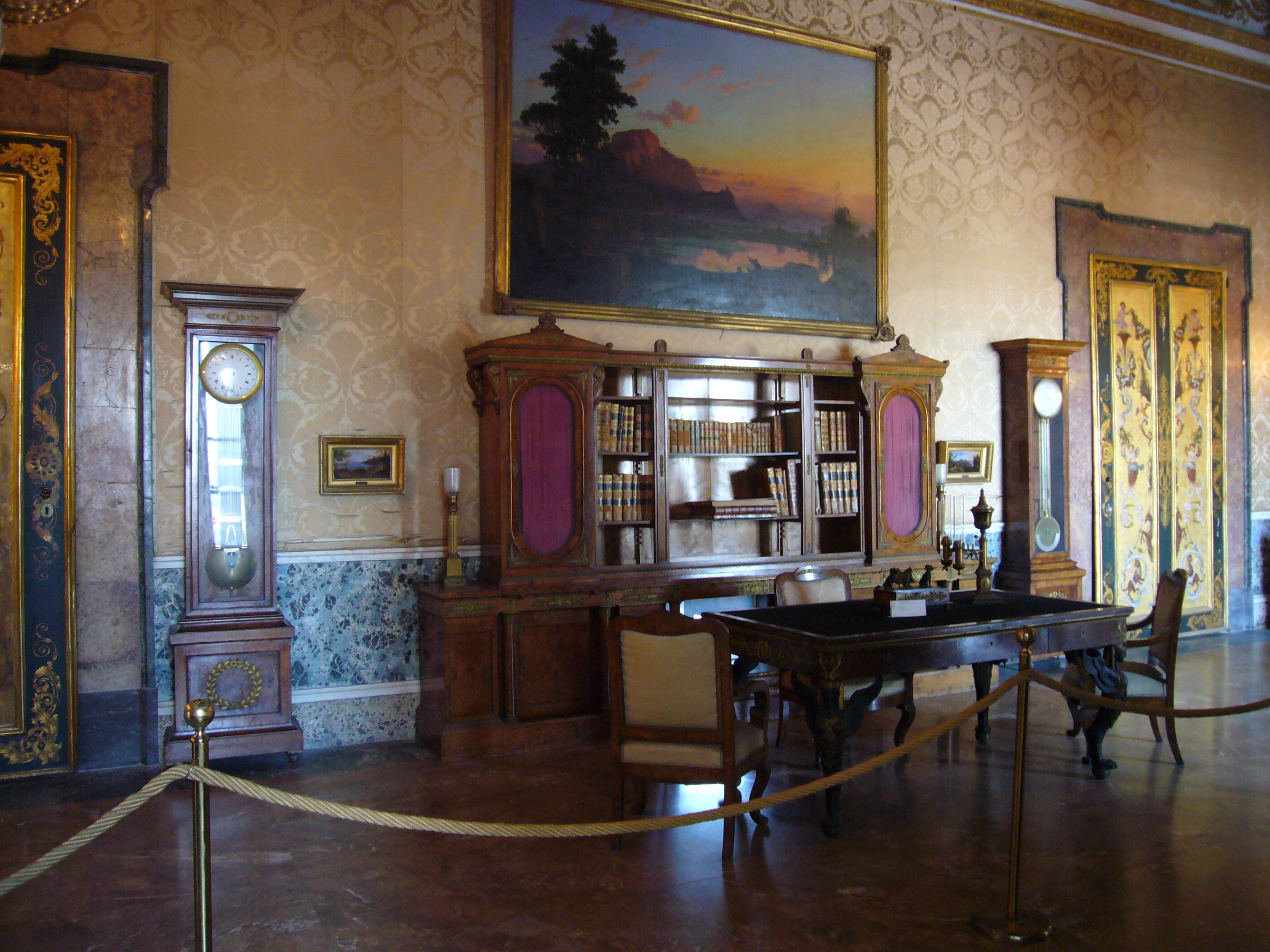
The King's Study (room XIII).

What is now known as the King's Study (room XIII) is a modern creation. Under Charles of Bourbon this space was occupied by two windowless rooms: a private room and the staircase leading up to the chambermaids' rooms. Genovese's renovation radically changed the space, converting it into a luxurious passageway leading to the "Queen's Etiquette Apartment". It was also Gennaro Maldarelli who painted another neo-Gothic fresco in 1840, this time the Disembarkation of Roger the Norman at Otranto. In the 1920s, the furniture from Ferdinand II's office in the east wing, which had been cleared to house the National Library, was installed in this room. These pieces of furniture (desk, chest of drawers and secretaire) were made by the Parisian cabinetmaker Adam Weisweiler and the bronzesmith Pierre-Philippe Thomire between 1808 and 1811 for Napoleon's apartments at the Quirinal Palace. In 1814, after the fall of the French Empire, Murat ordered them to be moved to Capodimonte. The rest of the decoration is complemented by two Sèvres porcelain vases given in 1817 by Louis XVIII and decorated with portraits of the said sovereign and his brother the Count of Artois; and a clock and a barometer from 1812, also French.

The so-called Hall of the Corps Guards (Room XXIX) was known in the 18th century as the "Dark Room", given its lack of windows. It is currently decorated with tapestries: the cycle of tapestries Allegory of the Elements (1740–1746), inspired by the models of the Grand Ducal Tapestry Factory in Florence; and a tapestry depicting the Allegory of Innocence from the series of Conjugal Virtues. (Note: The series conceived by Luigi Vanvitelli and Ferdinando Fuga was based on cartoons, currently in the Palace of Caserta, made by important painters of the time: the Allegory of Religion by Pompeo Batoni; the Allegory of Innocence and the Allegories of Charity and Generosity by Giuseppe Bonito; the Allegories of Justice and Peace by Stefano Pozzi; the Allegories of Fortitude and Vigilance by Corrado Giaquinto and the Allegory of Modesty by Francesco de Mura. The tapestries were woven from 1763 to 1767 with silver and silver-gilt threads by Pietro Duranti at the Royal Tapestry Factory of Naples and were intended for the bedroom of Ferdinand IV in the now-disappeared Belvedere wing.) The furniture includes stools with crossed swords from the Murat period, a Bailly clock from 1812 with a Thomire sculpture depicting Meditation, and on a console, a wax bust of Queen Maria Carolina of Austria.

=== Queen's Apartment ===
Today, this enfilade of rooms facing the sea is visited in the opposite direction, entering through the more intimate spaces and exiting through the more public rooms. Then, the tour is made in the opposite direction along the row of private rooms, located facing the courtyard.

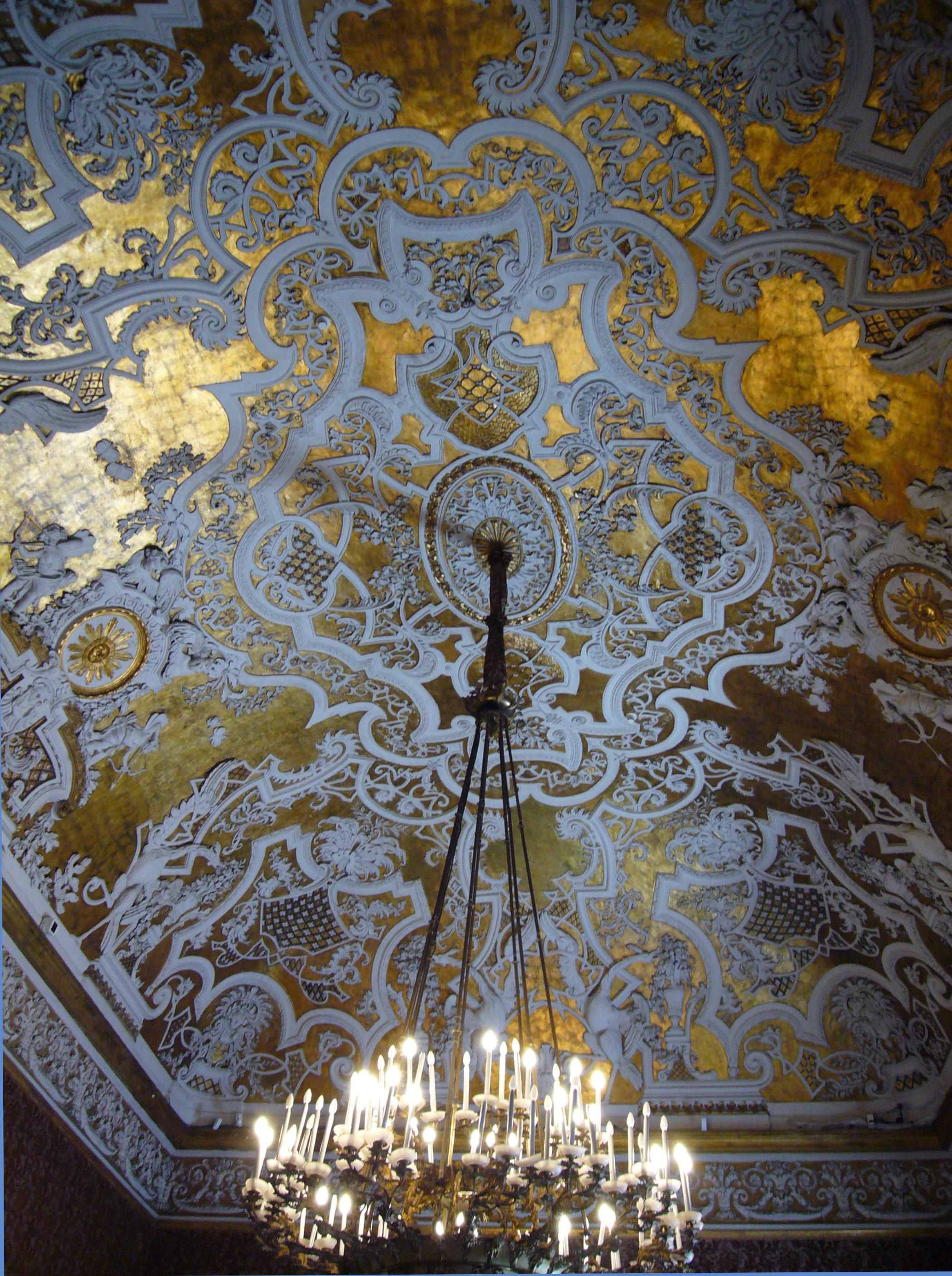
The rocaille ceiling of the Queen's Fourth Living Room (room XIV).

The Queen's Fourth Living Room (room XIV) received this name after Genovese's reform, since in the 18th century it was the "Queen's Bedchamber Room". The alcove with the bed was situated where the central door is now (room XXVII), next to which there were two small steps leading to the private rooms, the one on the left served as a cabinet or toilet (room XXXIV) and the one on the right as an oratory (room XXXVI). The stuccoed ceiling in rococo style by Giovanni Battista Natali dates from the Carolingian period. It features doves, a symbol of marital fidelity, putti shooting arrows of love, hippogriffs and vases of flowers. On the walls there are paintings from the Neapolitan school from the 17th and 18th century, including Orpheus and the Bacchantes and The Meeting of Rachel and Jacob, by Andrea Vaccaro, and two canvases by Luca Giordano from the church of Santa Maria del Pianto. The Neapolitan Empire style furniture dates from 1840 to 1841, the clock with carillon is English from the 18th century, while the table top is of hard stone, made by the Opificio delle pietre dure of Florence and given by Leopold II of Tuscany to Francis I.

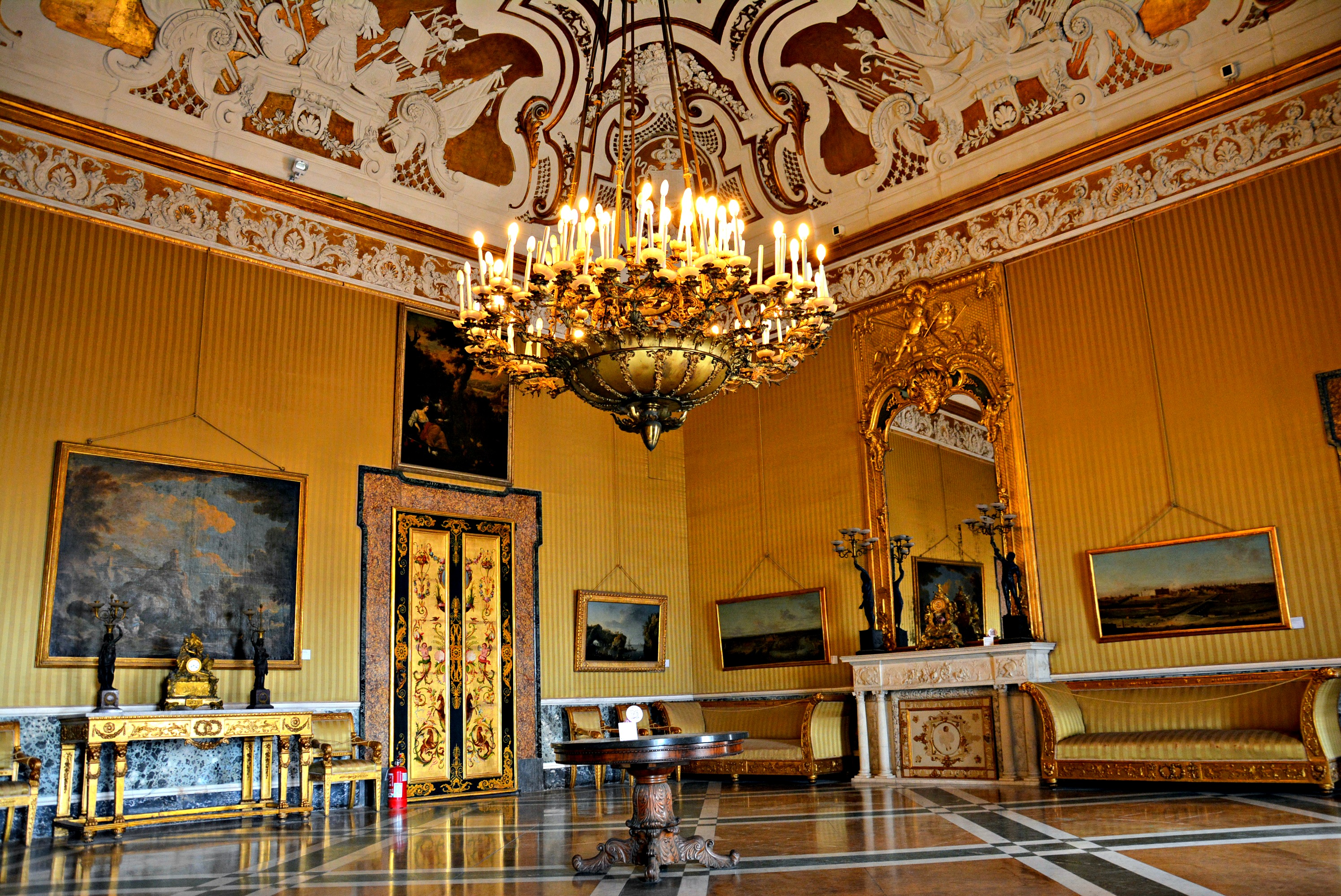
The Third Queen's Salon (room XV).

The Third Queen's Salon (room XV) was the "Hand-Kissing Room" of Maria Amalia of Saxony and Maria Carolina of Austria, and it also preserves a rocaille ceiling of white and gold stucco with representations of panoplies. It is also called the Hall of Landscapes due to the landscape paintings from the 16th to the 19th centuries that are exhibited; such as works by Pieter Mulier, representations of Spanish royal palaces by Antonio Joli, chronicle paintings by Jakob Philipp Hackert, the Seaports by Orazio Grevenbroeck, Laying of the first stone of the Basilica of San Francisco de Paola by Aniello de Aloysio, and Entry into Naples of Ferdinand I by Paolo Albertis. The Empire furniture dates from 1840, as does the fireplace, which reproduces the mosaic of the battle between Darius and Alexander the Great in the House of the Faun at Pompeii; in the centre of the room is a marble and soft stone table by Giovanni Battista Calì with a depiction of Naples seen from the sea and Ferdinand II in military uniform.

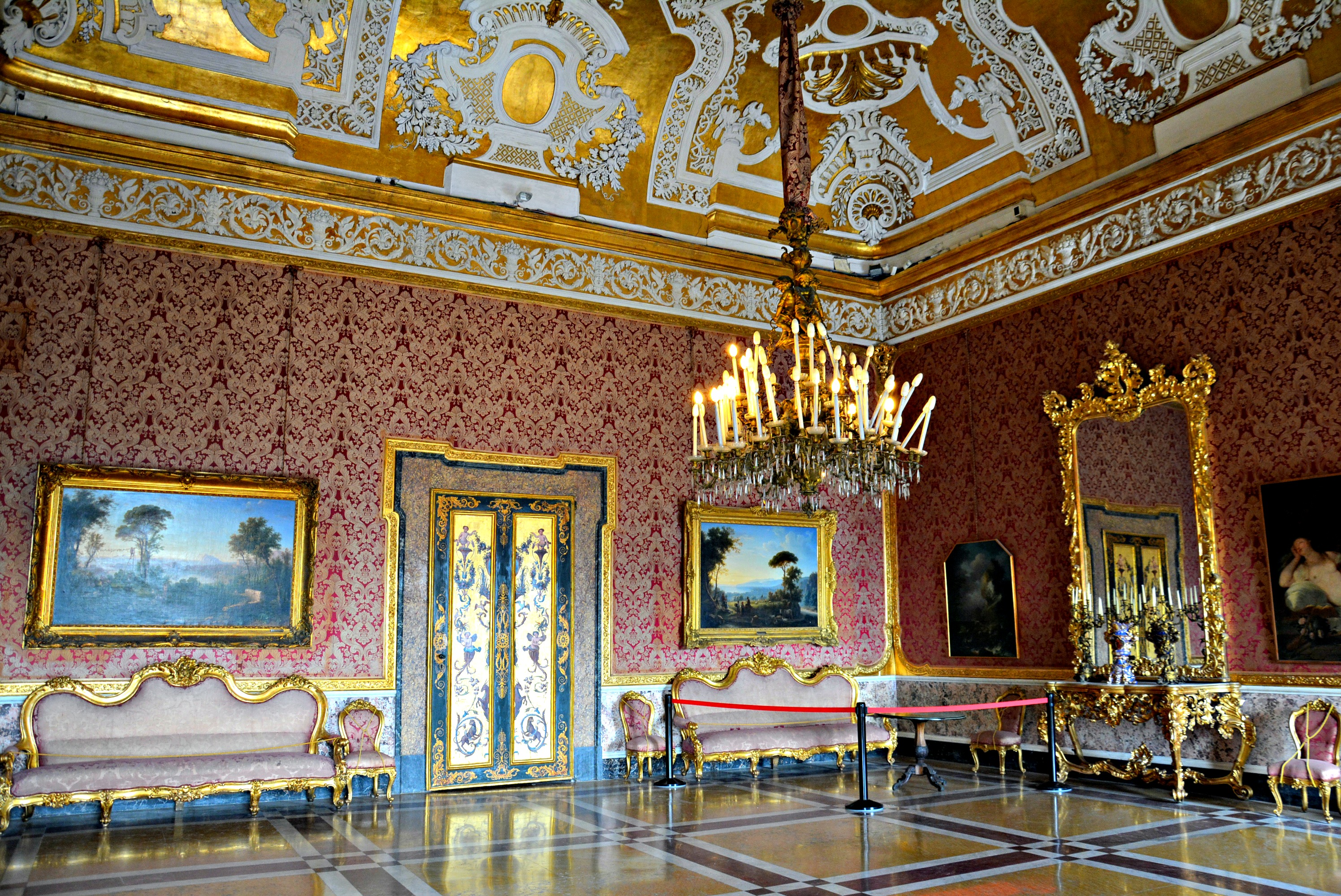
The Second Queen's Room (room XVI).

The Second Queen's Room (room XVI) served as the "Queen's Antechamber" in the 18th century and again retains a rococo ceiling in white stucco and gold. On the walls are paintings such as Venus, Eros and a Satyr and Battle of Horace Cocles by Luca Giordano, Perseus and Andromeda and Rape of Europa by Ilario Spolverini; two representations of battles by Pietro Graziani; Fantastic Shipwreck by Leonardo Coccorante; and two canvases with the same theme, Nocturne with the Burning of Troy, attributed to Diego Pereira. The furniture, in this case, is in the neo-baroque style and was added by the Savoys at the end of the 19th century, while the marble fireplace is from the Genovese period.

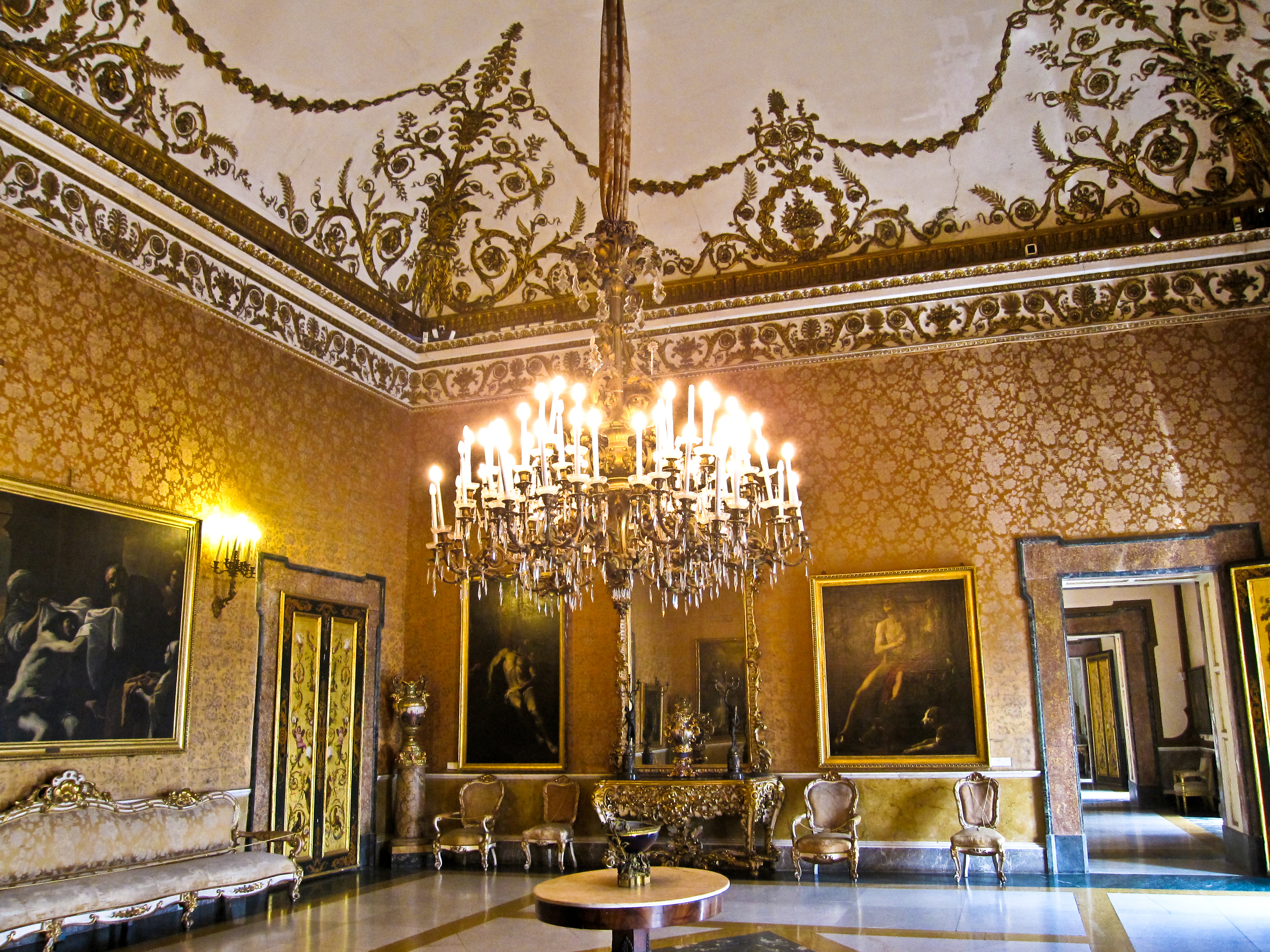
The First Queen's Room (room XVII).

The First Queen's Room (room XVII) was the "Queen's Bodyguard Room" in the 18th century, but had to be completely rebuilt after the fire of 1837. The ceiling by Gaetano Genovese dates from that period and is very similar to that of the two following rooms and those of the east wing. On the walls are paintings from the 17th century of the Italian school and other European schools belonging to the former collection of the palace: Return of the Prodigal Son by Mattia Preti, Orpheus by Gerard van Honthorst, Saint Jerome by Guercino, dating from 1640, and Dispute of Jesus among the Doctors by Giovanni Antonio Galli. The Neapolitan neo-baroque furniture in white and gold, consisting of an "extra-large" sofa, armchairs and a console table, dates from the Savoy period; and the French clock with a porcelain statue of Mary Stuart, from about 1840.

The Second Antechamber of the Queen (room XVIII) has a white and gold stucco ceiling from the Genovese reform under Ferdinand II, while the furniture is from the reign of Joachim Murat, of Neapolitan manufacture, and the Chinese vase is from the 18th century. The paintings on display in the room belong to the Farnese collection and are mostly by Emilian artists of the 17th century. (Note: Some of the canvases are: Saint Joachim and Anne at the Golden Gate of Jerusalem and Workshop of Saint Joseph, both by Bartolomeo Schedoni and probably from the church of Saint Francis in Piacenza; Dream of Saint Joseph by Guercino; Madonna and Child with Saints Augustine and Dominic by Giovanni Lanfranco; Saint Matthew and the Angel by Camillo Gavasetti; and Vision of Saint Romuald by Pier Francesco Mola.)

The First Antechamber of the Queen (room XIX) was later named the Still Life Room because of the still lifes hanging on its walls. (Note: Among these works, on the left are Still Life with Parrot and Rabbit by Giovanni Paolo Castelli, two copies of Still Life with Flowers and Fruit by Gaetano Cusati, Still Life with a Rooster by Baldassarre De Caro, Vase of Flowers by Mansù Dubuisson, Still Life with a Tray of Sweets and Flowers and Fruits with a Pewter Vase, by an anonymous author; on the right, Still Life with Allegory of Flora and Putti by Gaetano Cusati, Fish, Crustaceans and Shells in a Landscape, Table Presented with Rustic Cake, Plate of Macaroni with Grater and Piece of Cheese by Giacomo Nani and Still Life with Hunted Animals, Fillets and Plate of Egg Yolks by Scartellato.) a genre widespread in Naples during the 18th and 19th century. Many come from the country houses and hunting lodges of the Bourbon kings. The furniture consists of Neapolitan Empire-style consoles from the 19th century, rococo-style Sèvres porcelain vases, and a double table.

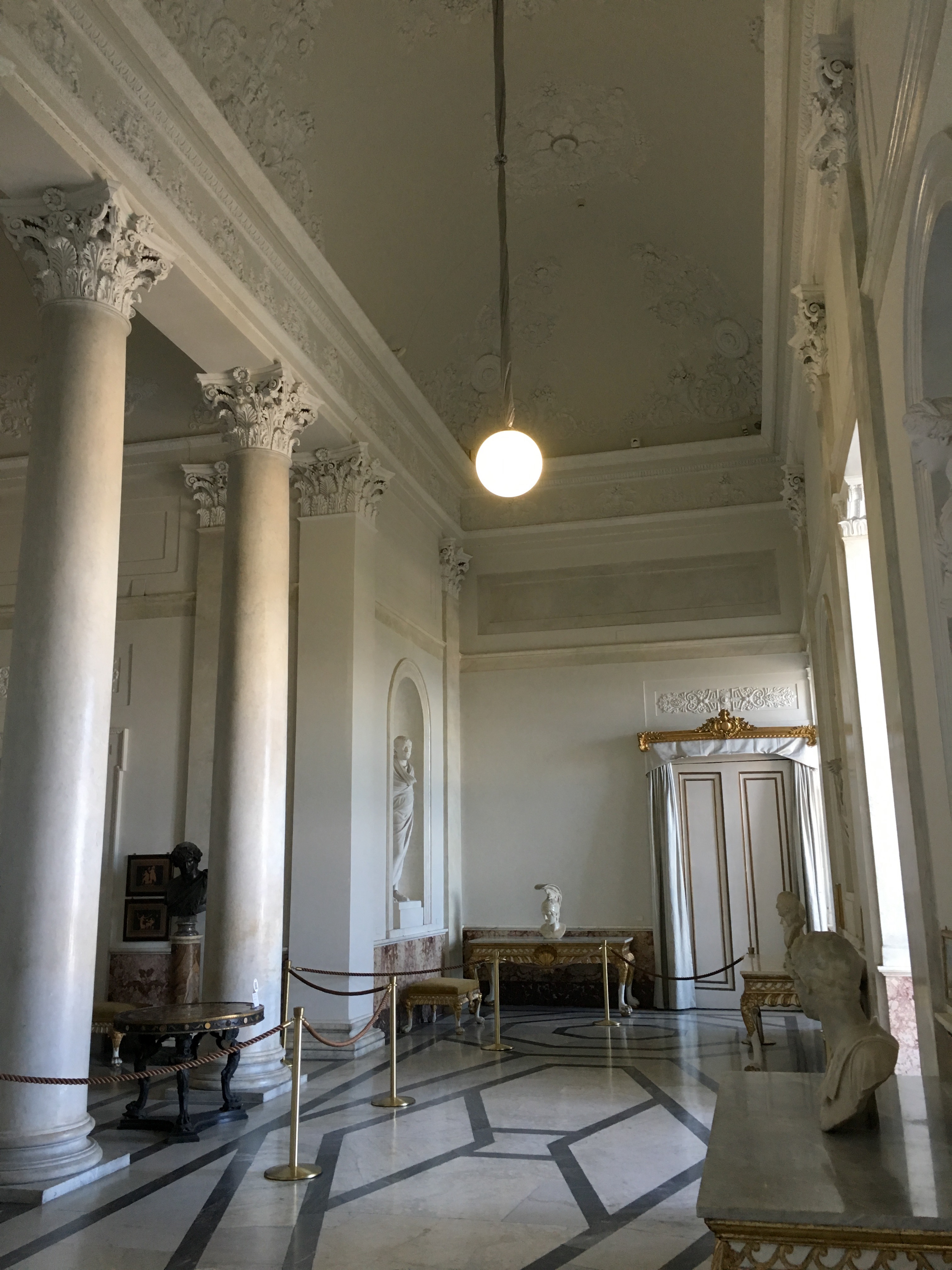
The Vestibule (room XX).

The Vestibule (room XX) is a large neoclassical space located in the centre of the south façade of the palace. It was created during the Genovese reform (1837–1844), which conceived a T-shaped space articulated by Corinthian columns and pilasters. It formed the fulcrum of the palace, connecting the "Queen's Etiquette Apartment", the Guest Staircase, the Hanging Garden and the eastern wing of the palace. The vault is covered in white stucco and the walls are home to four niches housing plaster copies of Roman sculptures. The other works on display also refer to neoclassical culture: engravings inspired by scenes on Greek vases in the Hamilton collection, made by Wilhelm Tischbein between 1791 and 1795; and three preparatory tempera paintings for the book of engravings Le Antichità di Ercolano Esposte, from 1757 and 1792; Biedermeier furniture; or a Neo-Pompeian bronze and marble table decorated with satyrs holding shells (originally portrait medallions of the royal family) a gift from Queen Maria Isabella to her husband Francis I for his birthday on 4 October 1827. In addition, there is a temple-shaped astronomical clock, a French Napoleonic clock with enamels by Coteau, the bronze bust Antinous as Dionysus by Guglielmo Della Porta, and the marble sculptures Roma Aeterna by Pietro Tenerani and Achilles with the Helmet by a disciple of Thorvaldsen.

=== Gallery and Hall of Hercules ===
The so-called Gallery (room XXI) leads directly onto the Carriage Courtyard and, like the nearby Vestibule (room XX), was a link between the western core of the palace and the eastern wing. The mirrors on the walls are set between neoclassical pilasters, while the furniture consists of white and gold consoles from the late 18th century, as well as armchairs dating from the French decade, a gilt bronze centrepiece and French porcelain from the 19th century.

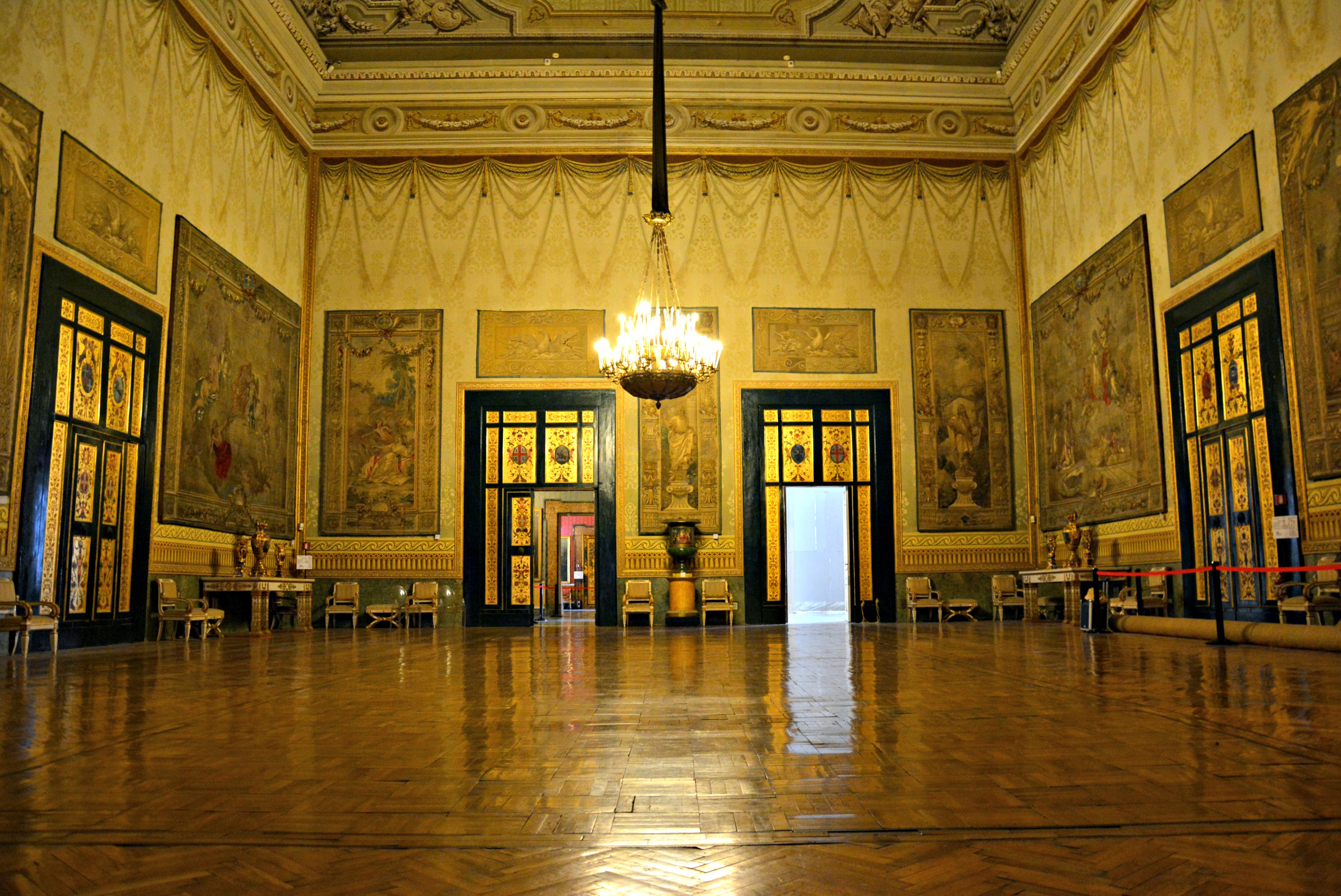
The Hall of Hercules (Sala XXII).

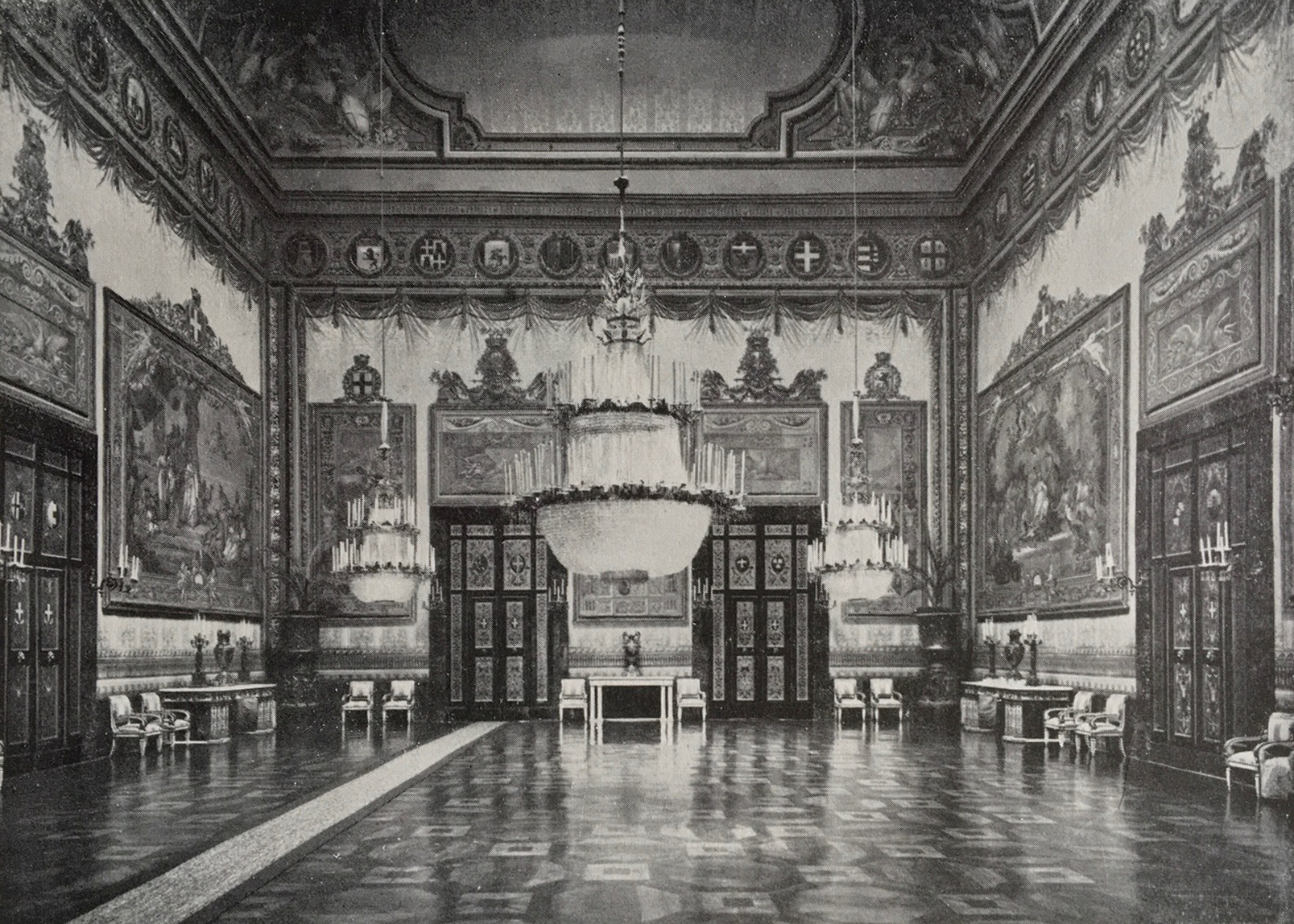
The Hall of Hercules circa 1900.

The Hall of Hercules (Room XXII) did not exist in the original project by Domenico Fontana, being added from 1648 by the viceroy Iñigo Vélez de Guevara and inaugurated in 1652 on the occasion of the celebrations for the end of the Reapers' War. It was then decorated with a series of portraits of the Spanish viceroys from 1503 onwards, the work of Massimo Stanzione, later continued by Paolo De Matteis, and was therefore given the name of "Hall of the Viceroys". As the "Sala Regia" (Room I) it was used for large-scale festivities and theatrical celebrations. Under the reign of Murat, between 1807 and 1809, the architect Antonio De Simone completely redecorated the space, removing the portraits and turning it into an antiquarium with plaster casts from the collection of antiquities such as the Farnese Hercules, from which it took its name.

From 1866 onwards it was again redecorated with a frieze with the coats of arms of the provinces of the unified Italy (destroyed during Allied bombings), the coat of arms of the Savoy family and a series of tapestries of Stories of Eros and Psyche manufactured between 1783 and 1789 by the Royal Tapestry Factory of Naples. The tapestries, in a late Rococo style that foreshadows Neoclassicism, are inspired by the fable of Apuleius and were made by Pietro Duranti from cartoons by Fedele and Alessandro Fischetti.

The room is also decorated with a French carpet from the second half of the 17th century made by the Savonnerie Manufactory for the Louvre and later brought to Naples by Murat; Boulle clock with marquetry, decorated with an Atlante holding the globe, by Isaac Thuret; a green Sèvres porcelain vase with a vignette depicting Homer among the potters of Samos by Antoine Béranger, donated to Francis I in 1830; and two "extra-large" neo-Rocaille vases of Limoges from 1847, from the Ballroom in the east wing and painted in Naples by Raffaele Giovine with scenes illustrating the abdication of Charles, Bourbon in favour of Ferdinand IV in 1759.

=== The Queen's private rooms ===
The sovereign's private and service rooms were located behind the main state rooms, facing the courtyard of honour. Today, it houses a collection of furniture and paintings from different periods from different areas of the palace.

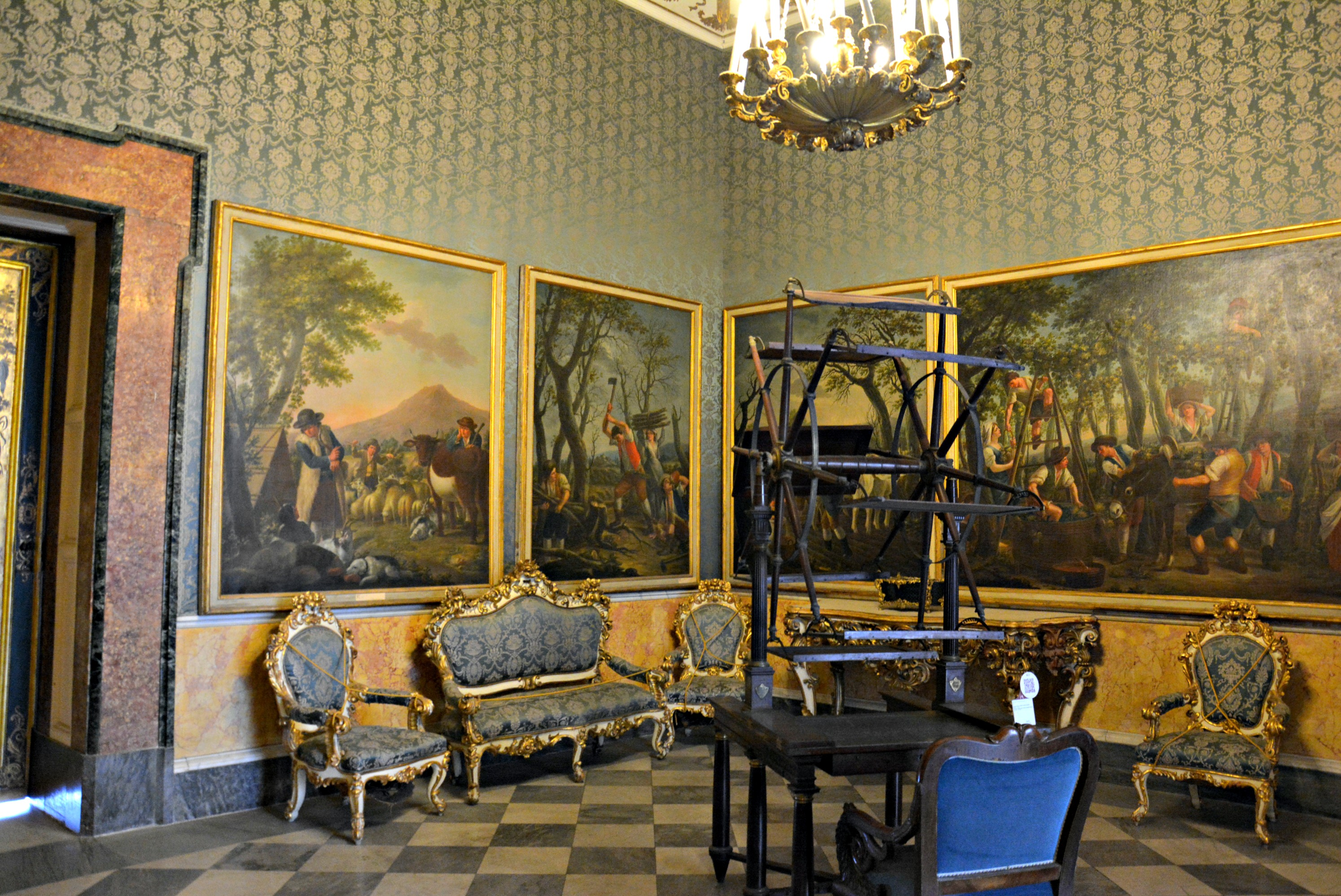
The first private room (room XXIII).

The first backroom (room XXIII) has a neoclassical ceiling designed by Genovese. On the walls are displayed six canvases of the Seasons and work in the fields by Francesco Celebrano and from the Royal Palace of Carditello. The furniture is neo-baroque and Neapolitan in manufacture. In the centre of the room there is a revolving lectern, typical of monasteries, made by Giovanni Uldrich in 1792. It comes from the library of Maria Carolina of Bourbon and allowed several books to be consulted at the same time, placed on eight hanging shelves that could be brought closer to the desk by turning a crank.

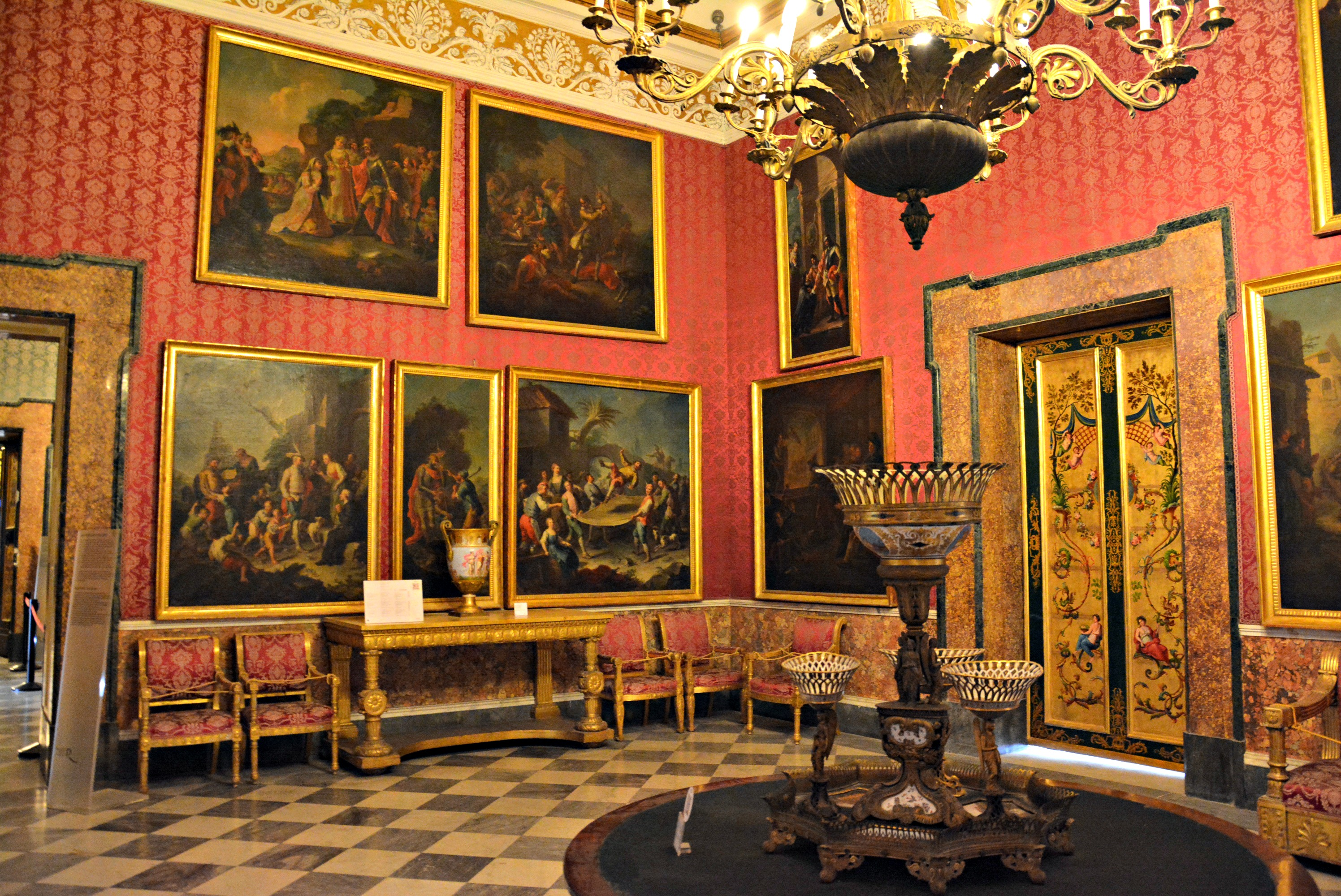
The second private room (room XXIV), dedicated to Don Quixote.

The second private room (room XXIV) served in the 18th century as a cabinet where books were kept the queen's porcelain collection, and still preserves the rocaille ceiling of gilded and white stucco from the 18th century. It is now dedicated to Don Quixote as it hangs nineteen preparatory canvases, out of thirty-eight completed, (Note: They were painted by court artists such as Giuseppe Bonito, Benedetto Torre, Giovanni Battista Rossi, Antonio Dominici and Antonio Guastaferro, while the drawings on the doors were made by Gaetano Magri, Orlando Filippini and Giuseppe Bracci.) which have as their theme the Stories of Don Quixote and served as a model for a series of tapestries, woven between 1758 and 1779 by Pietro Duranti at the Royal Tapestry Factory of Naples; They were commissioned by Charles of Bourbon for the king's bedroom at the Royal Palace of Caserta and later moved to the Quirinal Palace in Rome. The furniture dates from the first quindenio of the 19th century. The room is decorated with two Sèvres porcelain vases, decorated by Etienne Le Guay with an Allegory of Music and Dance from 1822; and a porcelain and gilded brass centrepiece, with porcelain plaques painted by Raffaele Giovine with the royal palaces of Naples, Capodimonte and Caserta, donated to Ferdinand II by the Municipality of Naples on the occasion of the promulgation of the Constitution of 1848.

The third and last room (room XXV) also preserves the rocaille ceiling with reticular motifs from the second half of the 18th century. The walls are hung with canvases of landscapes and costumbristas by painters active in Naples in the 19th century. (Note: Some of them are: three Seascapes by Salvatore Fregola; St. Mark's Square by Frans Vervloet from 1837; Tasso in the Convent of San Onofrio and Death of Tasso, both by Franz Ludwig Catel from 1834; Landscape with Castle by Achille Carrillo; Fishermen by Orest Kiprenskij from 1829; and a series of canvases by Pasquale Mattej documenting different aspects of the folklore and history of the regions of the Kingdom of Naples.) In addition, you can also see tapestries such as Allegory of Air, of Water and of Earth by Domenico Del Ross made by the Royal Tapestry Factory of Naples between 1746 and 1750, and inspired by those of the Grand Ducal Tapestry Factory in Florence. The furniture consists of English consoles from the 18th century, painted in white and gold; stools with goat legs dating from the reign of Joachim Murat; furniture (French neo-Gothic desk and bookcase from the 1830s) from the office of René Ilarie Degas (grandfather of Edgar Degas) in the Palazzo Pignatelli di Monteleone, donated in 1993 by Nicola Jannuzzi and Olga Guerrero de Balde; and the Portrait of Therese Aurore Degas by Joseph-Boniface Franque.

The now called Queen's Passage (room XXVI) is one of the side passages of her alcove (room XXVII) that connected the previous private room with her bedroom (room XIV), in the 18th century it served as a private oratory. In 1990, during a restoration, the false ceiling was removed, revealing a fresco depicting the Allegory of the matrimonial union, painted by Domenico Antonio Vaccaro on the occasion of the wedding of Charles of Bourbon and Maria Amalia of Saxony in 1738, as evidenced by the signature and date present on the fresco and the artist's requests for payment in 1739. Rococo in style with neo-mannerist features, the work was covered around 1837 when the private rooms were moved to the second floor. The paintings have literary and romantic themes, such as Tommaso De Vivo's Dante's Inferno and Beniamino De Francesco's Tasso in Sorrento. Among the furniture, a Sorrento marquetry table stands out.

The Alcove of Maria Amalia of Saxony (room XXVII) contained the sovereign's bed, and was open until 1837 with a large arch to the bedroom (room XIV). Its ceiling was decorated in the course of the 19th century with stucco, covering the previous frescoes painted in 1739 by Nicola Maria Rossi. Among the paintings of Neapolitan customs on display are Two Fishermen by Orest Adamovič Kiprenskij, presented at the Neapolitan Exhibition of 1829; The Wounded Bandit by Luigi Rocco from 1837; Easter Blessing by Raffaele D'Auria; and Sleeping Fisherman by Salvatore Castellano.

The so-called Boudoir of the Queen (room XXXIV) is the other side passage that communicated with her bedroom (room XIV), originally it served as a toilet. Also after the demolition of the false ceiling another fresco by Domenico Antonio Vaccaro came to light, depicting the Joy of the Royal Majesty with Peace, Fortune and Dominion. On the walls are placed various Chinese or Chinesque works from the Villa Favorita, Ercolano as: a series of small watercolours drawn in Canton in the mid-18th century that reproduce the themes dealt with in a Chinese text, the Gengzhitu, such as rice cultivation, porcelain production and silk manufacturing; or life-size representations of a Mandarin and a Chinese Lady, by Lorenzo Giusto from 1797. In the display cases there are urinals, desk services, instruments from the Royal Printing Office, fragments of pavement, an elliptical granite and marble desk and a porphyry table.

Room XXVIII is a passageway.

== The Royal Chapel ==
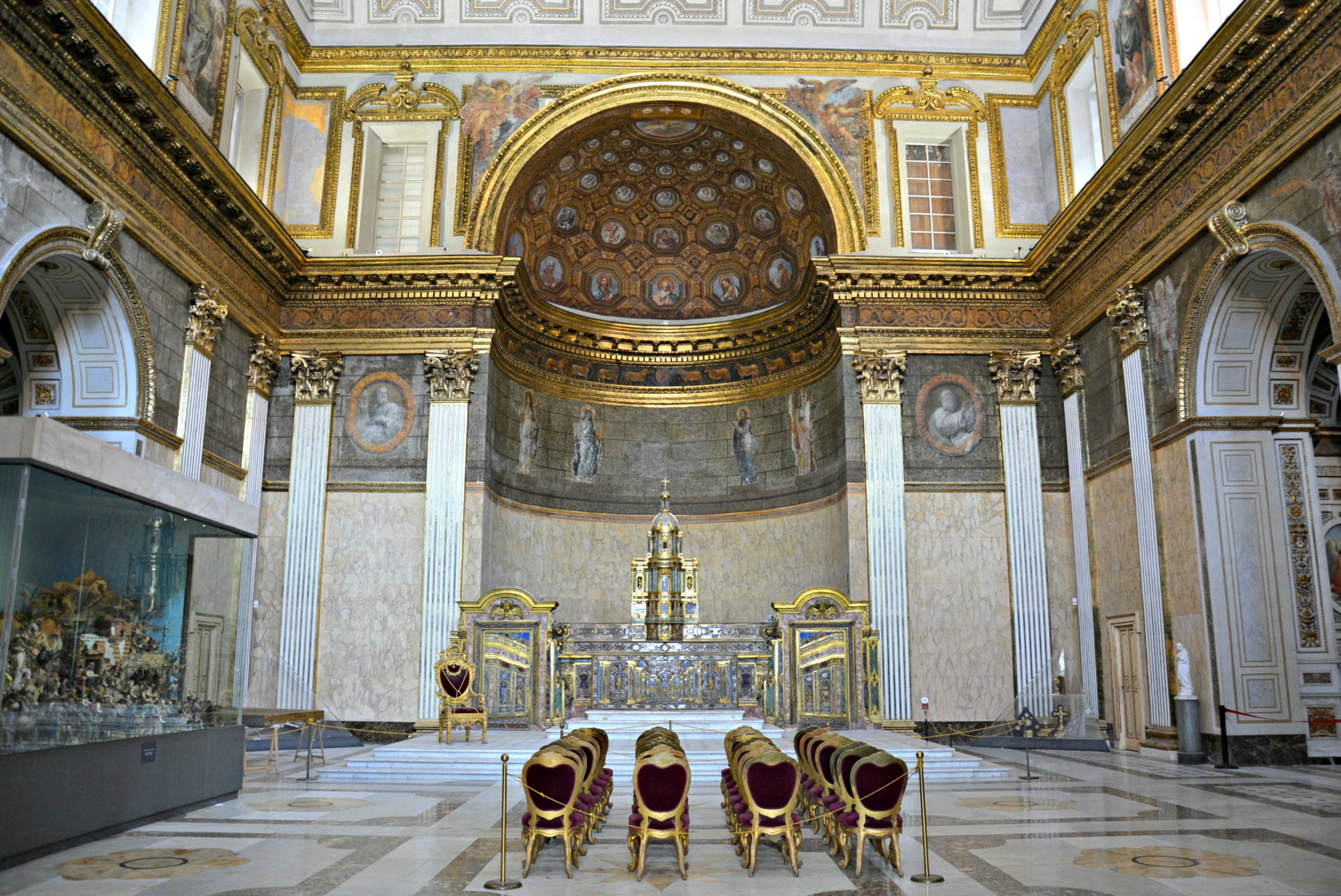
The Palatine Chapel, (room XXX).

The current Palatine Chapel (room XXX) is an interpretive recreation made after the bombings of World War II. The original chapel, already included in Fontana's project, was started in 1643 by the Duke of Medina de las Torres and finished and consecrated to the Assumption by the Admiral of Castile in 1646. The work was directed by Francesco Antonio Picchiatti, while the marbles were made by Giulio and Andrea Lazzari, the frescoes of the apse by Giovanni Lanfranco, those of the dome by Charles Mellin, the paintings of San Gennaro and San Paolino de Nola on the sides of the presbytery by Onofrio de Lione and the large altar painting with the Immaculate Conception was the work of José de Ribera. Decades later, the viceroy Pedro Antonio de Aragón ordered Ribera's painting to be sent to Spain and in its place a large statue of the Immaculate Conception sculpted in marble by Cosimo Fanzago to be placed in 1639.

Further modifications took place during the viceregal period: around 1656 the Count of Castrillo commissioned sumptuous paintings and stuccos for the walls from Giovan Battista Magno; while in 1688, after the dome collapsed due to an earthquake, Niccolò De’ Rossi and Giacomo del Pò painted the sacred stories on the cornice (partially preserved), finished only in 1705.

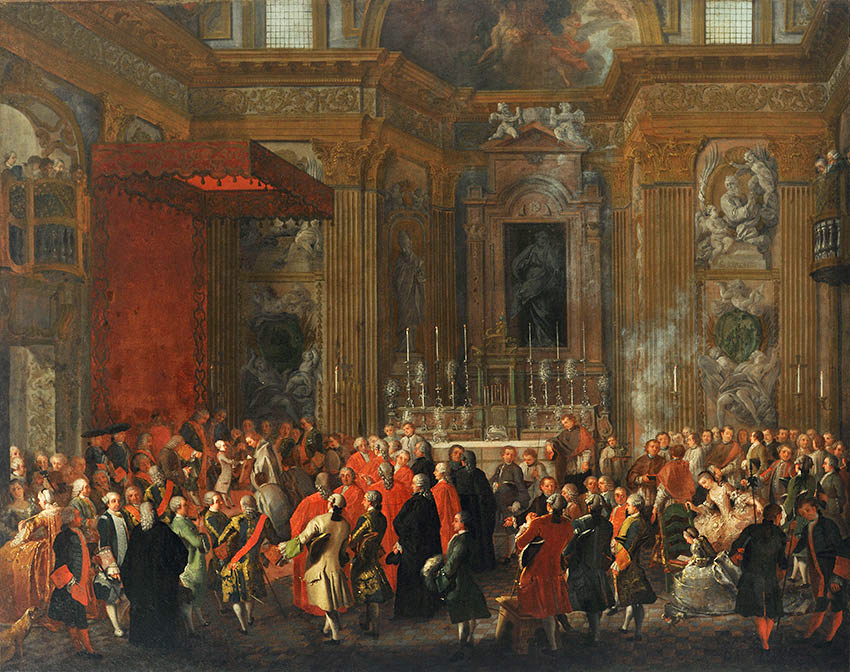
The Palatine Chapel in the 17th and 18th century.

The first major transformation of the chapel took place during the reign of Joachim Murat, who considered that the space was neither luxurious enough nor in keeping with French ceremonial standards, which required the sovereign to attend mass on a platform in front of the altar and not in a canopy next to the gospel, as had been customary with Spanish etiquette. The decorator Étienne-Chérubin Leconte presented an initial project that sought to lower the floor level of the chapel and create the galleries at the level of the ambulatory. However, it was judged too costly and complicated and in December 1812, another project was approved which planned to build the galleries on painted wooden columns without altering the level of the chapel. The works were carried out in 1813 and the chapel was inaugurated on 1 January 1814. The new chapel was completed with paintings of saints "alla maniera antica" located below the entablature by Gennaro Bisogni (preserved only in the apse) and a sumptuous altar of Hard stones from the Church of Santa Teresa degli Scalzi, whose religious community had been suppressed in 1808 by Joseph Bonaparte.

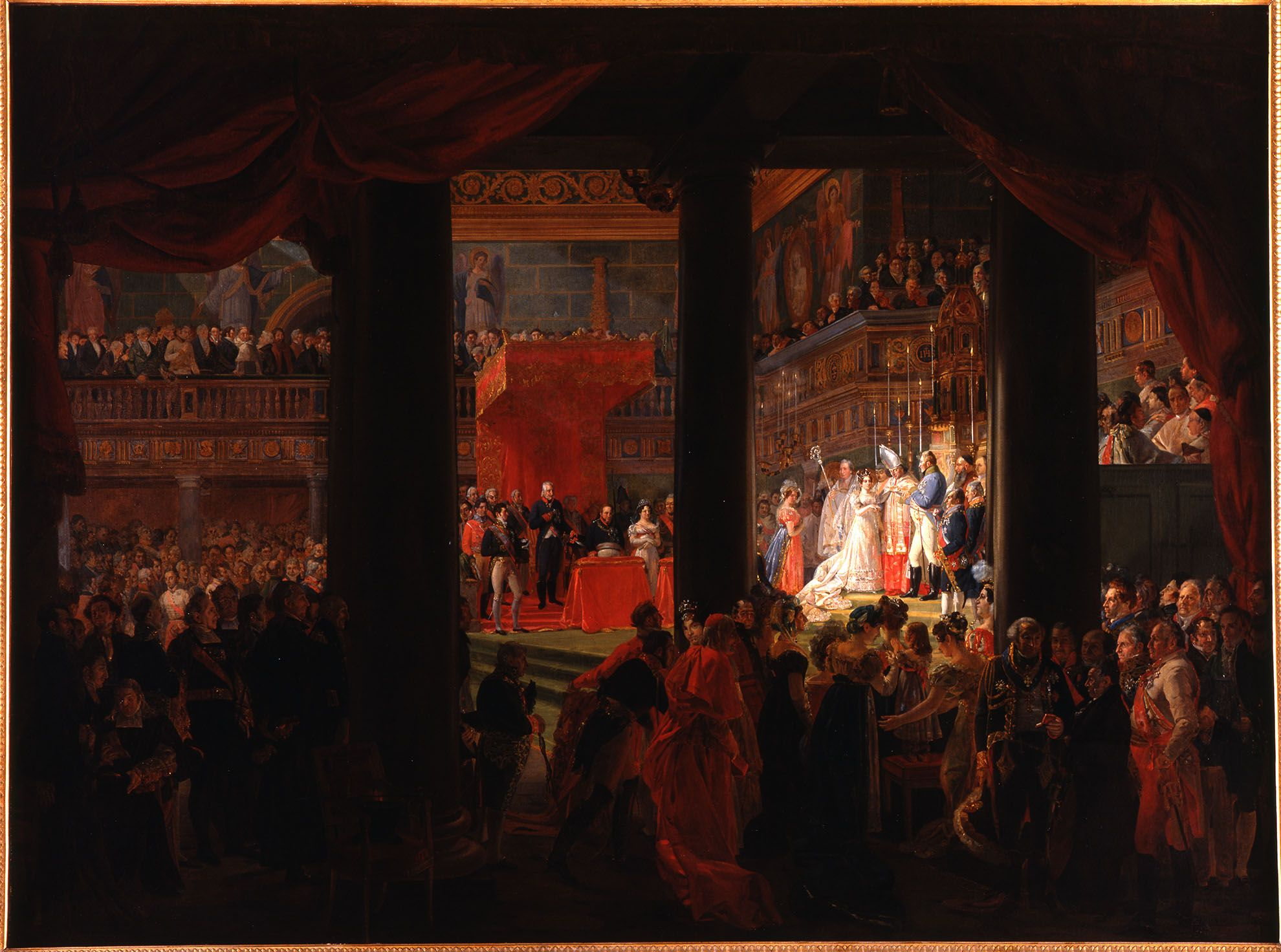
The Palatine Chapel with the galleries after the reform of 1813.

After the return of the Bourbons in 1815, no significant changes were made to the Palatine Chapel beyond the removal of the symbols of the French decade. Nor did Genovese's great reform affect the design conceived by Leconte. It was only around 1910, during the Savoy period, that the royal gallery in front of the altar and the two side galleries were removed, leaving only the elaborate gallery behind the altar for the choir.

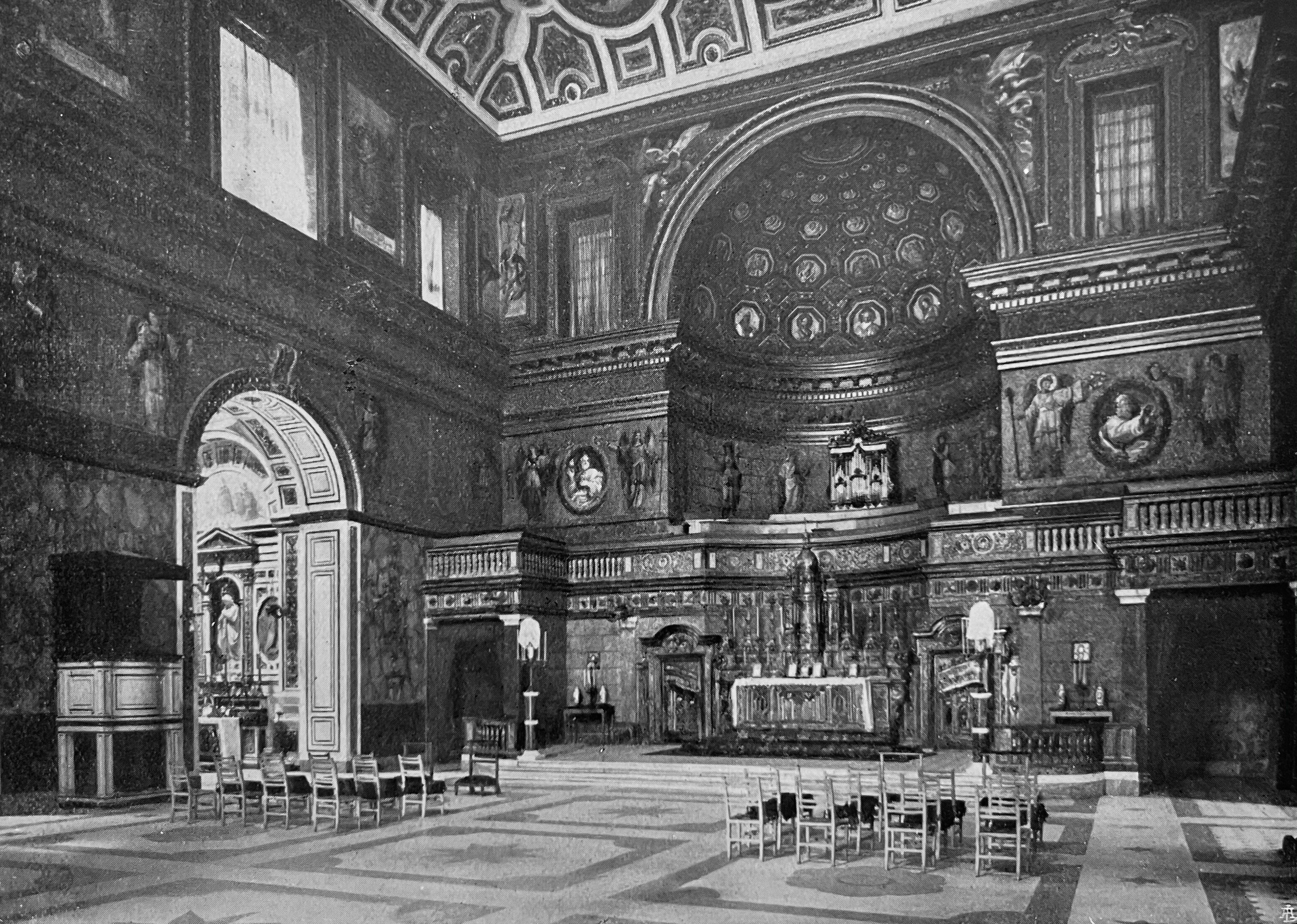
The Palatine Chapel, with the galleries partially dismantled, before the post-war reconstruction.

Badly damaged during the Second World War, the chapel was deconsecrated and used as a display for the vestments of the saints, which had previously been kept in the sacristy. Its appearance was profoundly altered by the post-war reconstruction, which chose to eliminate much of the 19th-century decoration that had survived the conflict to recreate an arbitrary and decontextualized version of the chapel in the 17th century, rebuilding the Corinthian pilasters above Bisogni's paintings of saints. A new space was thus created, emptied of much of its past.

Currently, the chapel is entered through a 16th-century wooden gate from the old Viceregal Palace. It has a single nave layout with three chapels on each side; The stucco and pictorial decorations are the work of artists from the Academy of Fine Arts of Naples such as Domenico Morelli. In the chapel is the nativity scene from the Banco di Napoli, made up of more than three hundred pieces from the 18th century and 19th century.

== The eastern wing ==
The current eastern wing of the Royal Palace of Naples dates back to the 17th century, when several heterogeneous and service buildings were erected in the rear gardens of the palace (which were once the gardens of the Viceregal Palace and before that of the Castel Nuovo). In a slightly oblique position facing the sea, the accommodation of the Equerry and the Chief Butler was built, with the coach houses on the ground floor (rebuilt by Giacomo Passaro in 1832). Between 1758 and 1760, following the original monumental architecture of Fontana, another parallel wing was built facing the city. It was called the "New Wing" (Italian: Braccio Nuovo) or "Porcelain Wing" (Italian: Braccio della Porcellana) because it housed the porcelain factory before it was moved to Capodimonte. The Courtyard of the Coaches was delimited between these two wings of different architecture. Between 1838 and 1840, Genovese rebuilt the Majordomo's wing and the coach houses in the Fontana style.

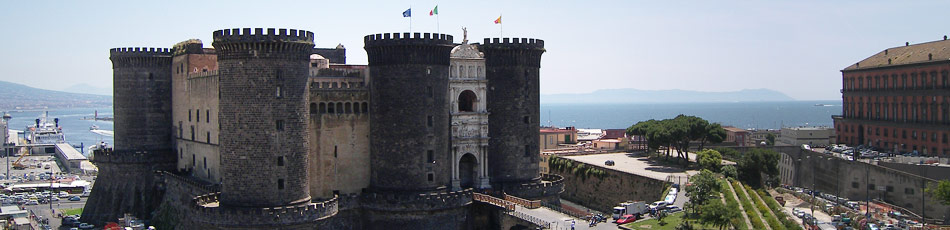
The Castel Nuovo and the eastern wing of the Royal Palace (far right).

Originally intended for the "Royal Princes", Queen Caroline Murat was the first sovereign to live there and commission major transformations, including a small private theatre and a separate staircase. Later, with the return of the Bourbons, it was the apartment of Francis I (as Duke of Calabria and as king) and his family, from 1830 to 1837 it was occupied by his widow the queen mother Maria Isabella of Spain, and it was in her chambers that the devastating fire of February 1837 broke out. After the renovation by Gaetano Genovese (1837–1844), the east wing became the residential core of the palace, hosting Ferdinand II, Francis II during his short reign and the sovereigns of the House of Savoy during their visits to the city. Between 1922 and 1924 the wing underwent profound transformations, being emptied of furniture and decorative elements to make room for the National Library.

=== The Royal Apartments ===
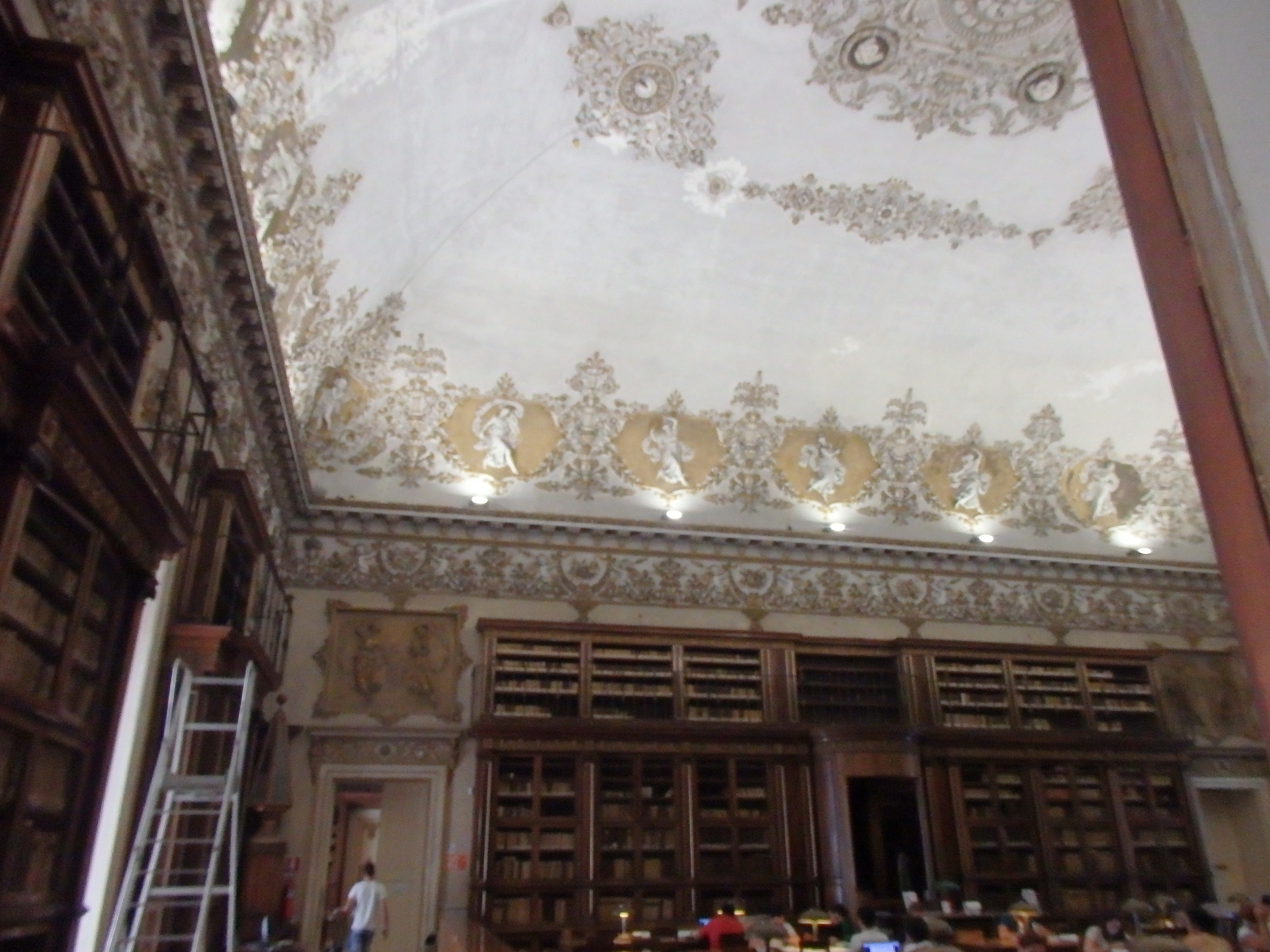
Ceiling of the Ballroom of the "Feast Apartment".

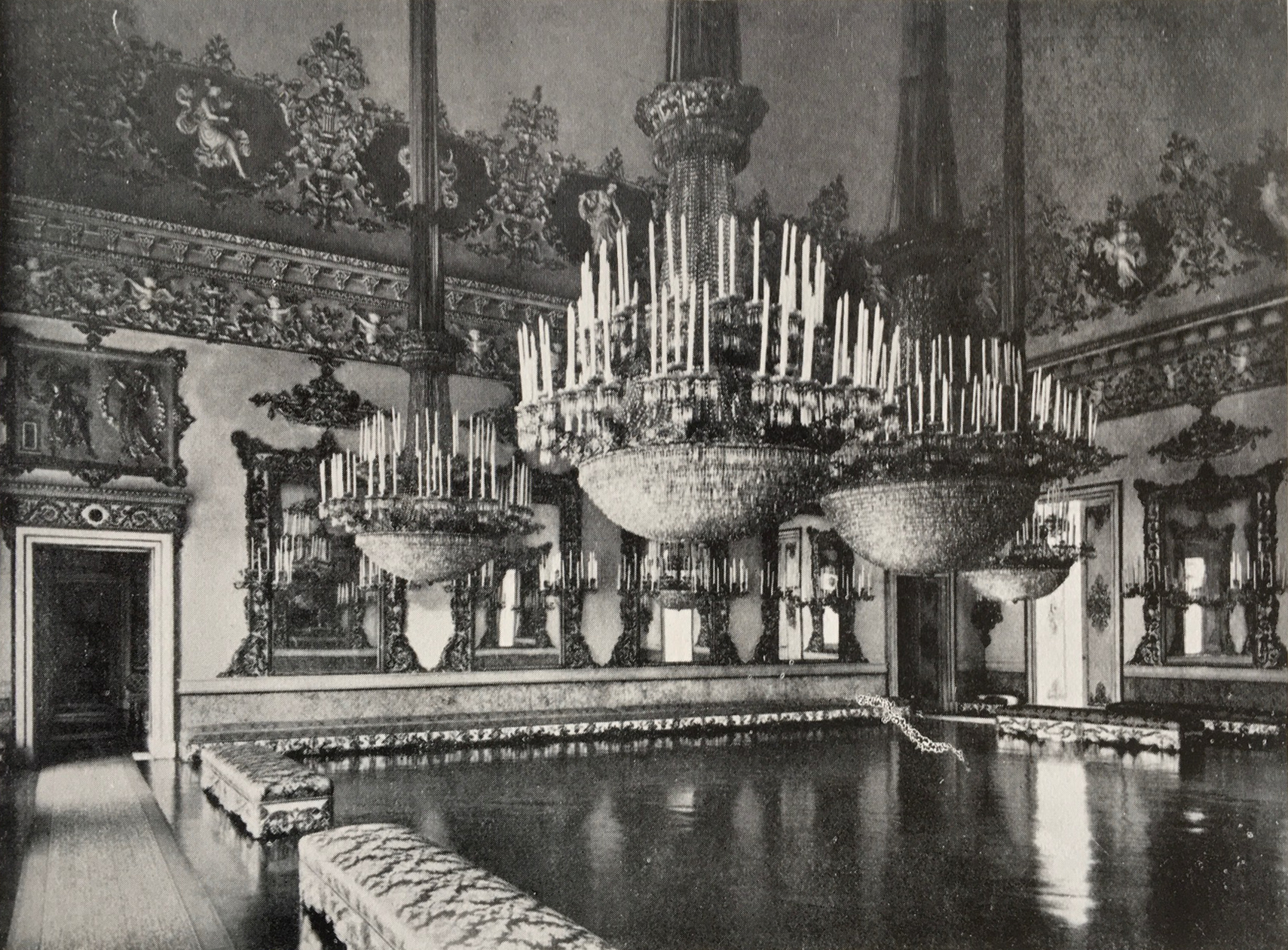
The Ballroom of the "Feast Apartment" before its transformation into a library.

From 1844 to 1922, the eastern wing was divided into several apartments. Its decoration was more contemporary, especially the painting collection, which tended towards small-format works commissioned by modern painters, compared to the old art gallery of the "Etiquette Apartment" (Royal Apartment).

- The "Festive Apartment" was originally the "reception room of the Duke of Calabria", before being converted by Genovese between 1840 and 1842 into a succession of rooms with a particularly profuse and rich decoration with large mirrors, silk hangings and, above all, elaborate stuccos on the ceilings framing frescoes with mythological themes and Mannerist aesthetics. Caroline Murat's private theatre was transformed into a luxurious mirrored ballroom which is now the Reading Room of the National Library.
- The "Apartment of the Dukes of Calabria" served as the private apartment of the heirs to the throne until 1859, and continued to be occupied by Francis II and Maria Sophie of Bavaria during their brief reign. From 1861 it was used by Vittorio Emanuele II on his visits to the city; Princes Umberto and Margherita lived there permanently from 1868 to 1870, then occasionally. It featured a sumptuous chapel with an iconostasis with saints painted on glass, and the walls were decorated with floral wallpapers ordered from Paris. Today it is the Rare Manuscripts section and the National Library Directorate.
- The "Daily Apartment of Ferdinand II" located on the second floor, was later inhabited by Prince Victor Emmanuel. The study of Ferdinand II (1854–1856), given its ceremonial importance, received the same decoration as some rooms of the "Etiquette Apartment": baroque stuccos and neo-medievalizing and romantic paintings linked to the historical past of Naples and the Norman, Angevin and Aragonese dynasties. In the private rooms, and especially in the king's luxurious bathhouse (1839–1841), a lighter and more precious type of Neo-Pompeian painting predominated, linked to the revival of interest in the excavations at Pompeii and Herculaneum in the 1830s and 1840s. Today it is the African Section of the National Library.
- The "Private Apartment of Queen Maria Theresa" on the second floor was also notable for its Neo-Pompeian, Neo-Medieval and Orientalizing decorations; with "Chinese" and "Turkish" rooms and a small "Gothic" oratory. The paintings and decorative repertoires were the work of artists from the Academy of Fine Arts of Naples such as Camillo Guerra, Giuseppe Maldarelli and Filippo Marsigli.
- the "Palatine Library" and the "King's Physics Cabinet", which was an astronomical laboratory created by the will of Ferdinand II. In 1879 it was dismantled and the instruments sent to the University of Naples.

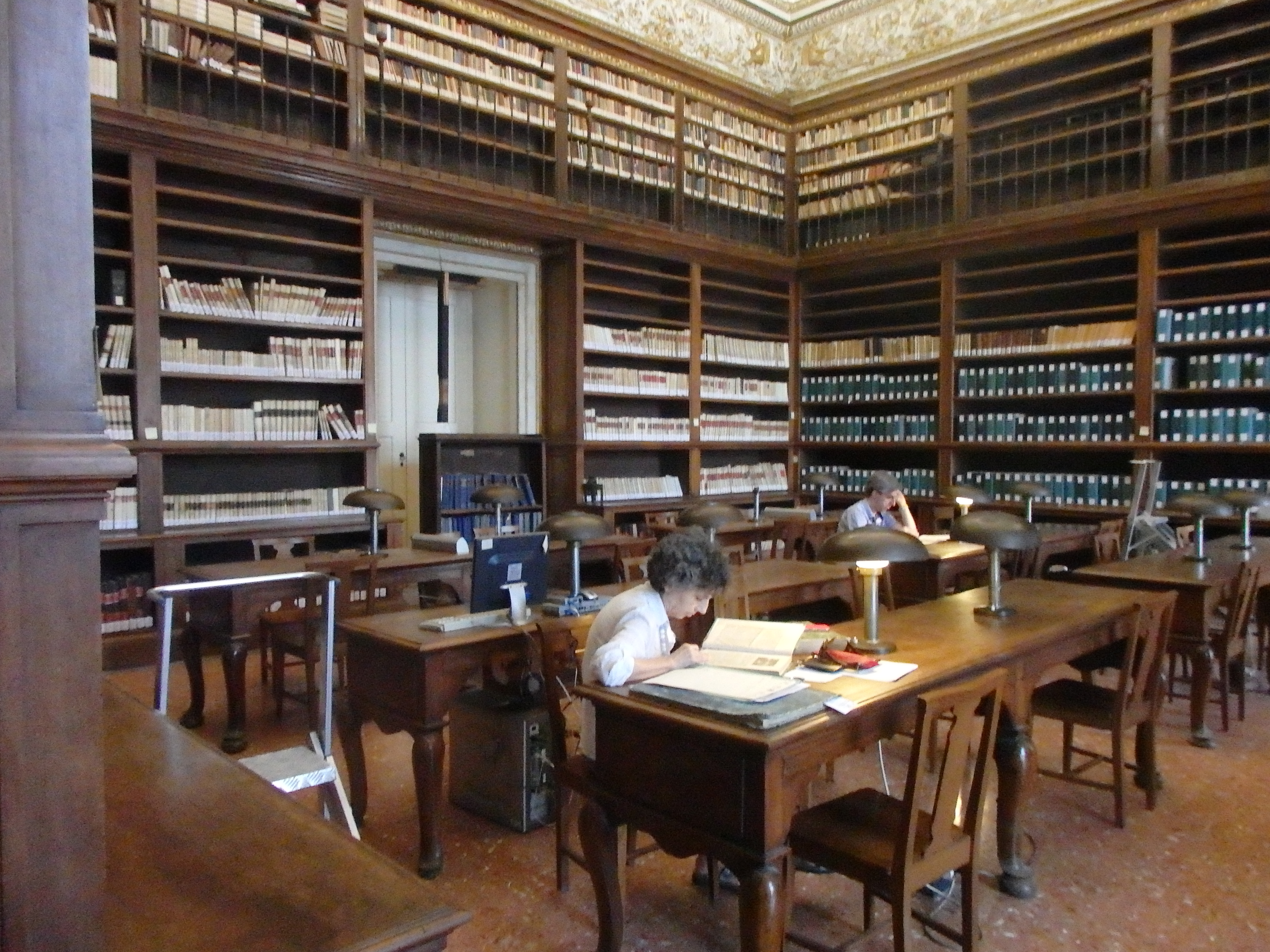
One of the rooms of the National Library that still preserves remains of nineteenth-century decoration.

=== The National Library ===
The National Library of Naples, dedicated to Victor Emmanuel III, has been located since 1923 in the eastern wing of the Royal Palace. With over two million texts, it is the most important library in southern Italy. It contains maps, projects, drawings, manuscripts, letters and collections of literature, art and architecture, from the Farnese collection and other collections acquired over the years, as well as the papyri from the villa of the same name found in the archaeological excavations of Herculaneum. Some of these texts bear the signature of prominent artists of the Italian scene such as Saint Thomas Aquinas, Torquato Tasso, Giacomo Leopardi, Salvator Rosa, Luigi Vanvitelli and Giambattista Vico.

== The gardens ==
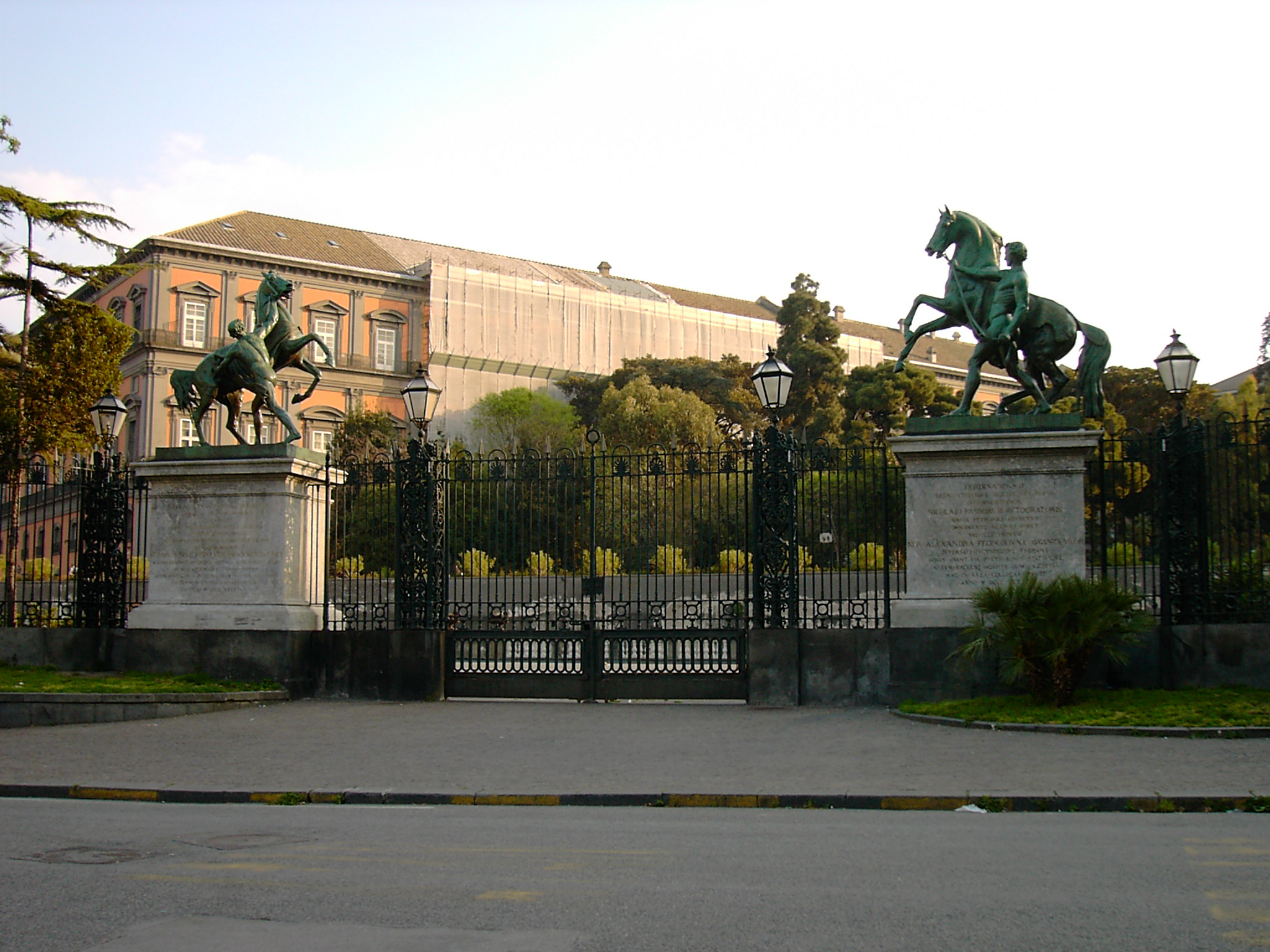
The two bronze Palafreniers present near the garden gate.

The so-called Romantic Garden of the Royal Palace is what remains of the ancient gardens of the viceregal palace. This strolling garden behind the east wing was created in 1842 by the German botanist Friedrich Dehnhardt taking advantage of the space created after the demolition of some buildings used as stables, located between the Royal Palace and the Castel Nuovo. The garden has flowerbeds designed with whimsical and sinuous shapes; among the plants it houses are some local species and others exotic, such as Ficus macrophylla, Strelitzia nicolai, Persea indica, Pinus canariensis, Magnolia grandiflora, Jacaranda mimosifolia and Cycas revoluta. The plants are marked with signs indicating their planting date. The entire garden is surrounded by a fence with gilded spearheads. In 1924 Camillo Guerra made a new path and an exedra-shaped staircase near the garden gate to provide a separate entrance to the National Library. On either side of this gate are two bronze palafreneros, the work of Peter Jakob Clodt von Jürgensburg, copies of those made in Saint Petersburg, a gift from Tsar Nicholas I in memory of his stay in Naples in 1845, as recalled by a plaque.

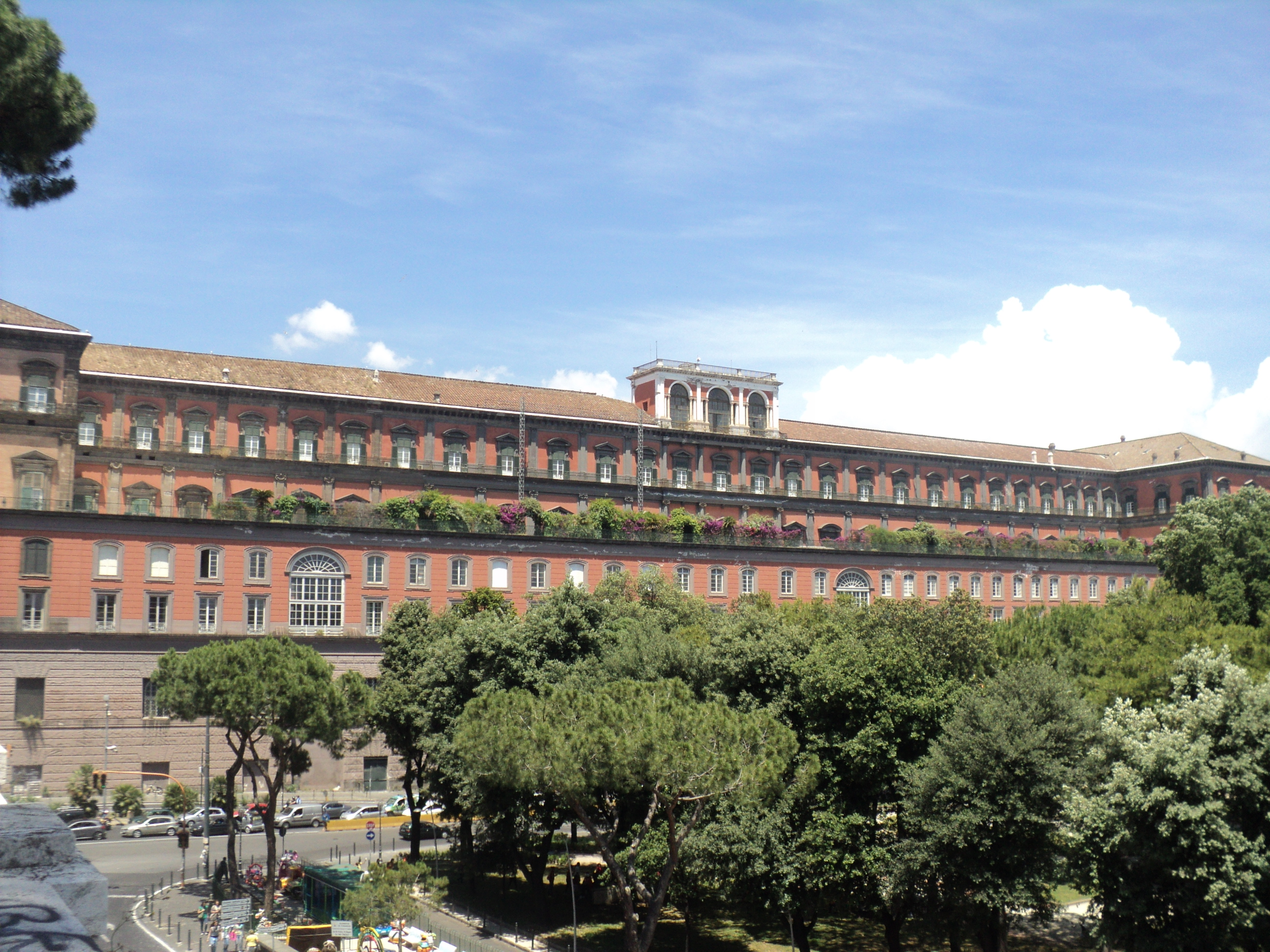
The façade along Via Acton with the hanging gardens.

The stables serve as a buttress to the garden and are a room of about twelve hundred square metres characterised by their roof, which has eighteen vaults supported by a central row of square pillars. On one side there are limestone mangers, while the marks left by the horses are still visible on the pavement. Below is a building built in the 1880s and used as a riding school. In this area there are also the ruins of the old riding school and the old stables, demolished by Genovese, and, on a slightly elevated area, what was once the tennis court of Umberto I of Savoy.

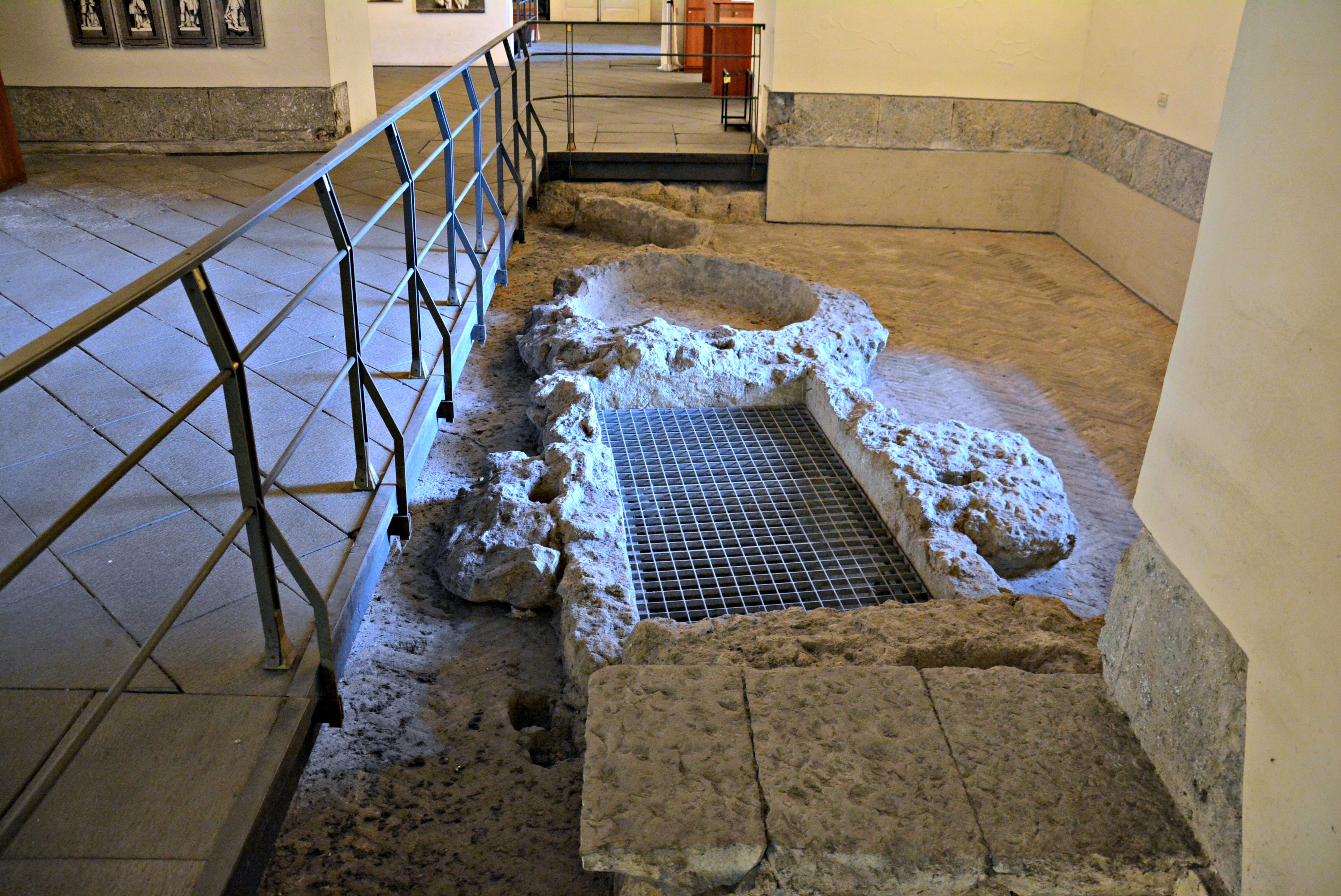
The finds found near the entrance.

In addition, the palace has the Hanging Garden facing the sea and which is accessed from the first floor of the Royal Apartment. The first evidence of this garden dates back to some engravings by Francesco Cassiano de Silva from the late 17th century, which show a small terrace attached to the Belvedere wing. It was reorganized in 1745 by De Lellis and later by Bianchi, while it assumed its definitive appearance with the restoration of Genovese in the mid-19th century. The main plants are Bougainvillea and climbing vines; in the center, between the vestibule and the cast iron bridge, there is a fountain and a table with jets. The work is completed by neoclassical marble benches, cast iron pergolas and flowerbeds.

During the 1994 restoration, between the entrance to Piazza del Plebiscito and that of Piazza Trieste e Trento, on what was the original entrance to the palace, a path was found, about one metre below ground level, that was part of the ancient gardens of the Viceregal Palace. This path was built with bricks laid herringbone, with blocks of volcanic stone on one edge and supported, on the other, against a retaining wall of the 16th century garden. Its lower part is made of blocks of tuff, and the upper part, with blocks of trachyte added later.

A little further on, a rectangular well was found, flanked by two circular tanks. Stratigraphic studies concluded that the well was lined with masonry for a depth of about thirteen metres, followed by another two and a half metres dug directly into the tuff, finally reaching a square chamber where the water from the aquifer was collected; the bottom was covered by a layer of silt about forty centimetres thick. After the start of the construction of the Royal Palace, the well was abandoned and used as a rubbish dump. At its bottom, for a height of about four metres, organic materials were found – thanks to the presence of water, which allowed its preservation – such as animal bones, remains of fish and molluscs, branches and fruit grains, and also construction materials such as majolica and worked wood, which have allowed the reconstruction of the lifestyle of this period. It was later filled with waste materials up to its brim.

== The San Carlos Theatre ==
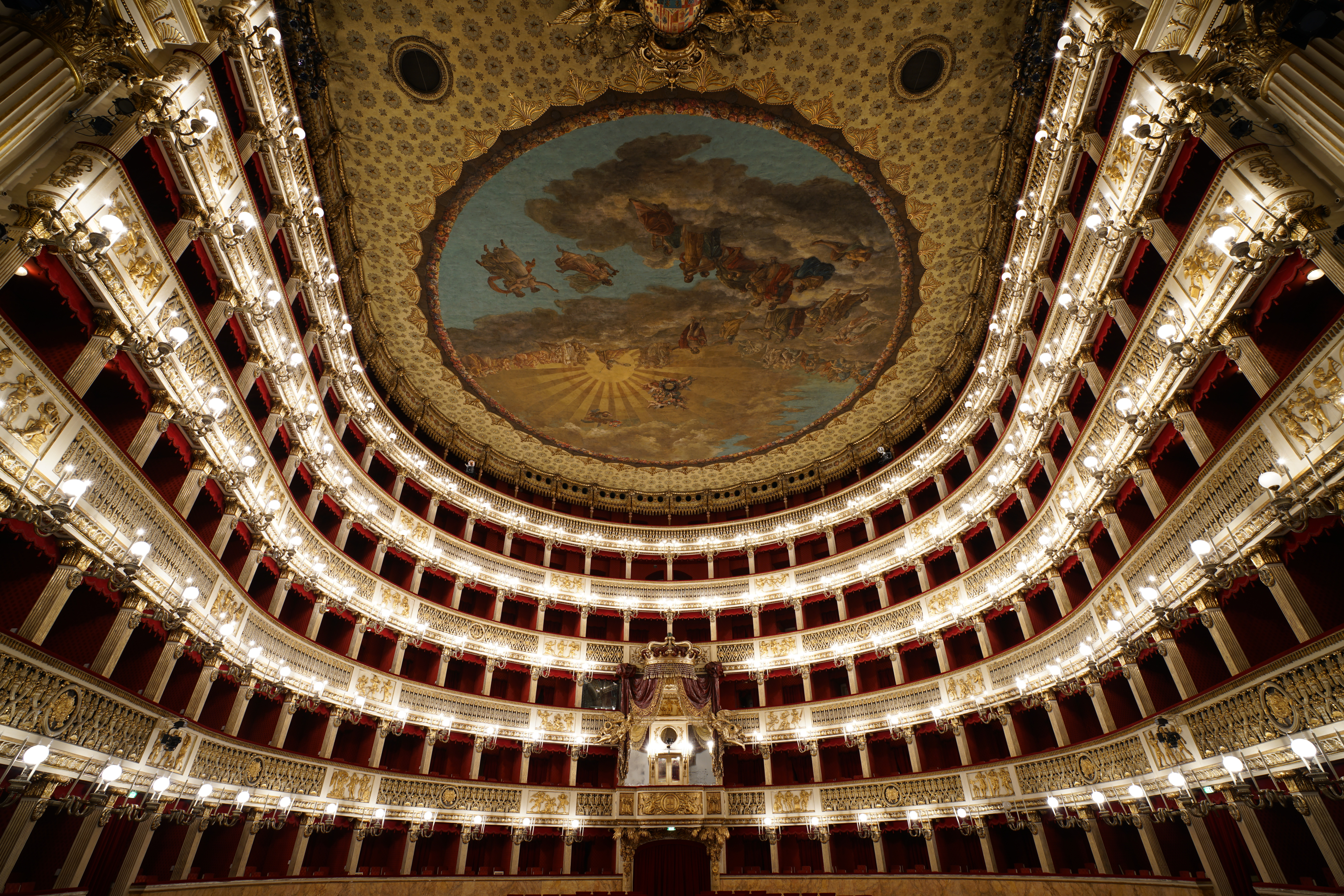
Interior of the San Carlos Theatre.

The San Carlos Theatre also belongs to the Royal Palace complex. Built by Giovanni Antonio Medrano, it was inaugurated on 4 November 1737, on the occasion of the name day of the king. Over the years, the theatre has undergone numerous renovations, both to the façade and to the interior. The façade, which at first had simple architectural lines, was modified by Antonio Galli da Bibbiena in 1762, by Ferdinando Fuga in 1768 and by Domenico Chelli in 1791, until it assumed its definitive appearance in neoclassical style with a rusticated ground floor, a Doric order gallery on the first floor and bas-reliefs after the works carried out by Antonio Niccolini between 1810 and 1812. Niccolini himself also restored the interior in 1841 and later in 1861, after a fire, with the help of his son Fausto and Francesco Maria Del Giudice. Expanded in the 1930s, the interior of the theatre, which can seat just over 1,300 spectators, is horseshoe-shaped and decorated with representations of putti, cornucopias and classical themes. The vault is decorated with the fresco Apollo presenting to Mercury the greatest Greek, Latin and Italian poets, the work of Giuseppe Cammarano. The curtain dates from 1854, was made by Giuseppe Mancinelli and represents Muses and Homer among poets and musicians. The theatre is directly connected to the royal palace by two vestibules, one on the ground floor, the other, private, on the piano nobile, with neoclassical decoration, and through the garden.

== Literature ==
- Anselmi, Alessandra (2009). La Calabria del viceregno spagnolo: storia, arte, architettura e urbanistica (in Italian). Roma: Gangemi Editore. ISBN 978-88-492-9121-6.
- Ascioni, Gina Carla (2010). La stanza dove Sua Maestà dorme, chiamata del Belvedere (in Italian). Napoli: OADI – Rivista dell'Osservatorio per le Arti Decorative in Italia. Archived from the original on 26 September 2021.
- Ascioni, Gina Carla (2014). Vita di corte al tempo di Carlo di Borbone (in Italian). Napoli: Arte'm. ISBN 9788856904086.
- Carughi, Ugo (1999). Palazzi di Napoli (in Italian). Arsenale. ISBN 8877432195.
- Casalegno, Carlo (1956). La regina Margherita (in Italian). Turín: Einaudi. ISBN 8815083553.
- Cirillo, Ornella (2008). Carlo Vanvitelli: architettura e città nella seconda metà del Settecento (in Italian). Florencia: Alinea Editrice. ISBN 978-88-605-5309-6.
- D'Arbitrio, Nicoletta; Ziviello, Luigi (2003). Carolina Murat, la Regina francese del Regno delle Due Sicilie (in Italian). EDISA.
- De Cesare, Raffaele (1900). La fine di un regno (in Italian). Castello: S. Lapi Tipografo-Editore.
- Delli Paoli, Antonella; Gei, Stefano. Il palazzo reale di Napoli nel periodo del viceregno spagnolo (PDF) (in Italian). Naples: Servizio Educativo del Palazzo Reale di Napoli. Archived from the original (PDF) on 15 March 2016.
- Delli Paoli, Antonella; Gei, Stefano. Il palazzo reale di Napoli nel periodo borbonico (PDF) (in Italian). Nápoles: Servizio Educativo del Palazzo Reale di Napoli.
- Delli Paoli, Antonella; Gei, Stefano. Guida alle sale dell'appartamento storico (PDF) (in Italian). Nápoles: Servizio Educativo del Palazzo Reale di Napoli.
- Fiadino, Adele (2003). "La residenza di Carlo di Borbone a Napoli". Napoli-Spagna. Architettura e città nel XVIII secolo (in Italian). Edizioni Scientifiche Italiane. ISBN 884950652X.
- Ghisotti, Silvia; Merlotti, Andrea (2017). Dalle regge d'Italia. Tesori e simboli della regalità sabauda, catalogo della mostra (Reggia di Venaria, 2017) (Exhibition catalogue). Genoa: Sagep.
- Mascilli Migliorini, Paolo (1997). "Le trasformazioni ottocentesche del Palazzo Reale". Civiltà dell' Ottocento. Le arti a Napoli dai Borbone ai Savoia. Architettura e urbanistica (in Italian). Vol. 2. Nápoles: Mondadori Electa. ISBN 978-8843556656.
- Mascilli Migliorini, Paolo (2017). "Il Palazzo Reale di Napoli e i Savoia". Dalle regge d'Italia. Tesori e simboli della regalità sabauda (in Italian). SAGEP. ISBN 978-8863734812.
- Papagna, Elena (2007). "La corte murattiana". All'ombra di Murat - Studi e ricerche sul Decennio francese (in Italian). Bari: EdiPuglia.
- Porzio, Annalisa (1997). "La Reggia di Napoli nell'Ottocento". Civiltà dell' Ottocento. Le arti a Napoli dai Borbone ai Savoia. Le Arti Figurative (in Italian). Vol. 1. Nápoles: Mondadori Electa. ISBN 978-8843587070.
- Porzio, Annalisa (1999). La quadreria di Palazzo reale nell'Ottocento: inventari e museografia (in Italian). Nápoles: Arte tipografica.
- Porzio, Annalisa (2014). Il Palazzo Reale di Napoli (in Italian). Nápoles: Arte'm.
- Sasso, Camillo Napoleone (1856). Storia de' monumenti di Napoli e degli architetti che gli edificavano (in Italian). Nápoles: Tipografia Federico Vitale.
- Sgarbozza, Ilaria (2011). "Ferdinando II e la promozione delle arti a Napoli". Mecenatismo pontificio e borbonico alla vigilia dell'Unità (in Italian). Roma: Viviani Editore. ISBN 978-88-79931-48-9.
- Touring Club Italiano (2008). Guida d'Italia - Napoli e dintorni (in Italian). Milán: Touring Club Editore. ISBN 978-88-365-3893-5.
- Verde, Paola Carla (2011). "Mutamenti del cerimoniale: il nuovo scalone e la sala Guevara del Palazzo Reale.". Dimore signorili a Napoli (in Italian). Nápoles: Intensa San Paolo.
- Epifani, Mario, ed. (2024). Quattro secoli di storia. Il Museo della Fabbrica di Palazzo Reale (in Italian). Naples: Editori Paparo. ISBN 979-1281389137.
