= City Walls of Altamura =

Italian defensive structure

- Muro di cinta di Altamura (Italian)
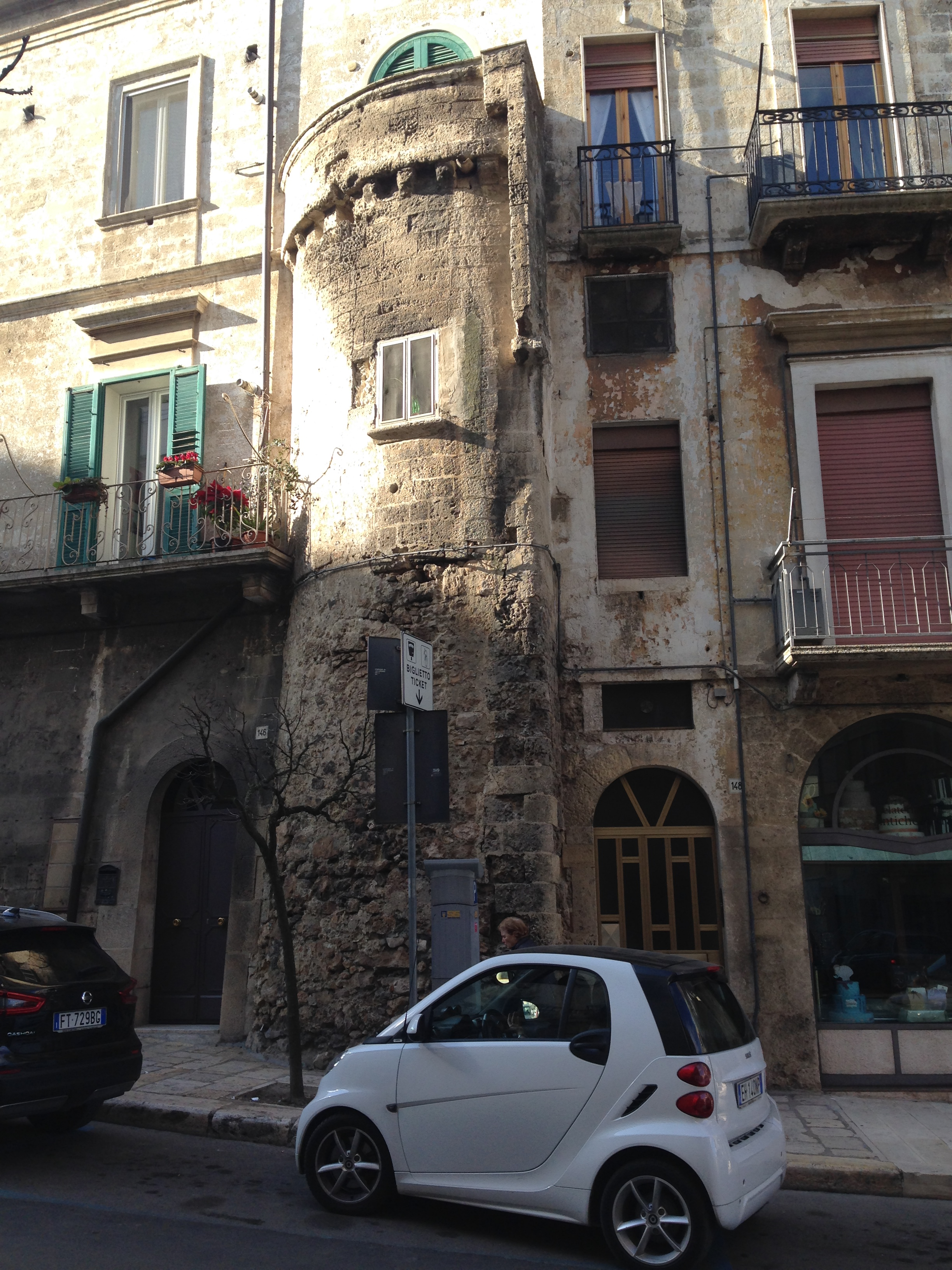
- Tower "with upper torus and walkway" of the city walls, located close to the gate "Porta Foggiali".
- Interactive map of City Walls of Altamura
- 40.826042°N 16.556494°E
- Location: Altamura

History
- Original use: Defensive wall of the ancient city (starting from the Middle Ages)

The City Walls of Altamura were a military structure meant for defensive purposes and located in the city of Altamura, Italy. Its origin dates back to the Middle Ages and it was in use until the 19th century when it started to be gradually torn down. Nowadays only a few isolated parts of the walls survive. It shouldn't be confused with the Megalithic Walls of Altamura, which date back to the 5th–4th century BC and intersect in some parts with the city walls.

Just a few maps depicting the city walls still survive and they are part of the maps Carte Rocca, commissioned by Angelo Rocca (drawings P/32 and P/33) and dating back to the end of the 16th century. Drawings dating back to earlier periods didn't survive.

== History ==
The city walls were first built in 1285 by Sparano da Bari, using a part of the pre-existing Megalithic Walls of Altamura. The connection of the boundary wall matches what must have been the layout of the megalithic walls in the part that goes from Porta Foggiali to Porta Matera and Porta del Carmine, as stated by Domenico Santoro (1688). Original feature of the walls is the presence on top of it of the bas-relief depicting "Pipino's leg", located close to Porta Matera, in the same place where a leg of the rebel Giovanni Pipino di Altamura (1357) was displayed as a warning to the population.

The wall was renovated in 1648, with the addition of improvements such as the Aragon-style buttresses. The bas-relief depicting Pipino's leg was destroyed and rebuilt on that occasion.

The demolition of the wall took place throughout the 19th century. In particular, during the demolition of a part of the city wall named "Muraglia Marvulli", four bullets were found in 1863 which the then mayor of Altamura—Candido Turco—suggested that they were shot by the Sanfedisti during the Altamuran Revolution (1799).

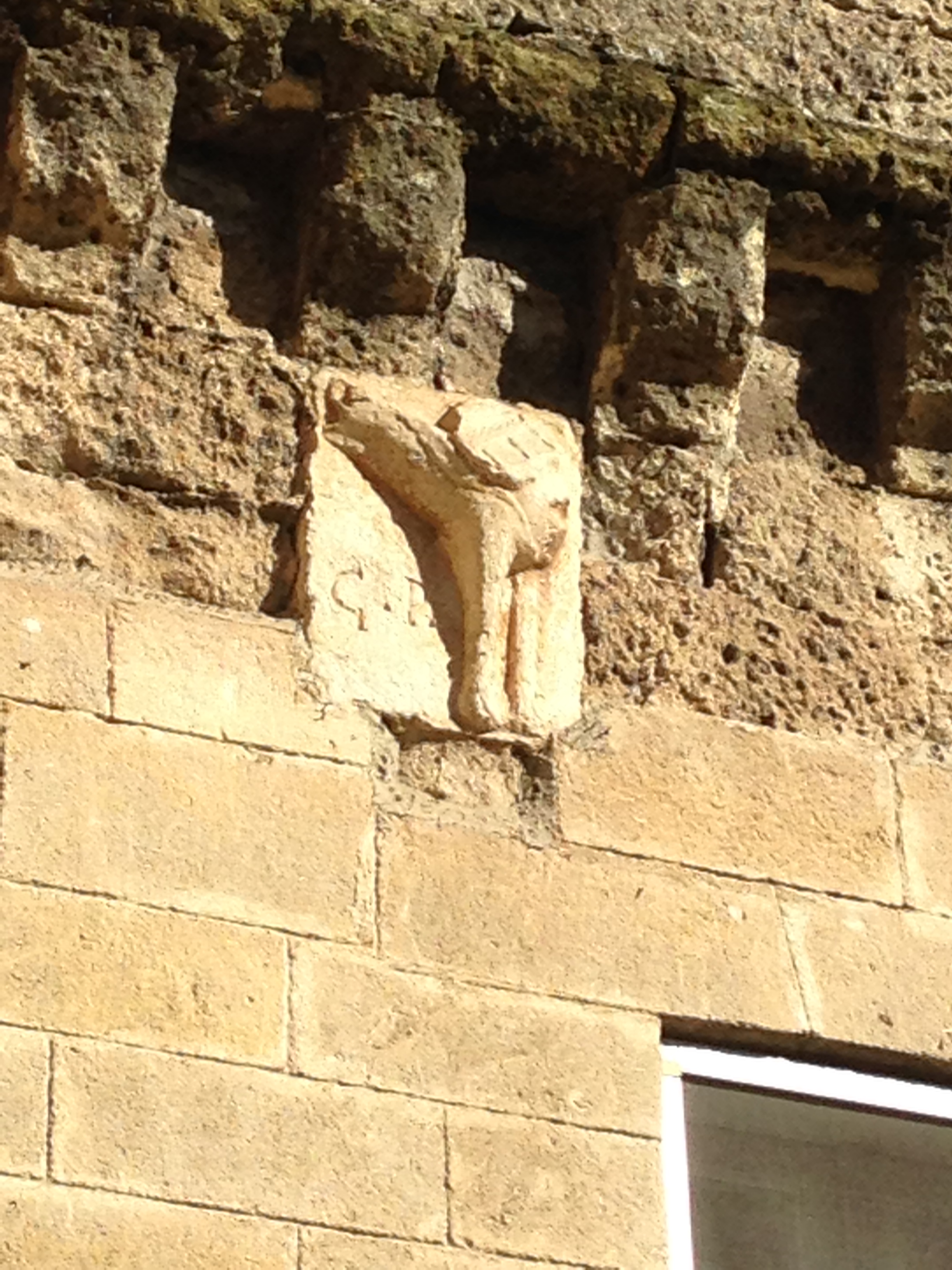
Bas-relief located on the right side of Porta Matera depicting "Pipino's leg"

== Structure ==
The city walls had the typical characteristics of a defensive military structure and, in particular, some of its features are inferred the maps known as Carte Rocca (it should be added that Carte Rocca do not provide a complete representation, but they tend to represent some of its features, since some areas of the city look empty). It must also be taken into account that the walls were restructured and improved in 1648, with the addition of Aragon-style buttresses.

In the map Carte Rocca P/33 a moat surrounding the walls is clearly visible in some parts; a few drawbridges for the gates of Altamura Castle and Porta Foggiali are also drawn (the latter looks more similar to a footbridge).

As stated by Domenico Santoro (1688), the part of walls between Porta Foggiali and Porta Matera (and perhaps up to a Porta del Carmine) intersected with the Megalithic Walls of Altamura, and today some remains of the city walls in this section show a stone base that was probably part the pre-existing megalithic walls.

== Gates ==
The City Walls of Altamura comprised six gates:

- Porta Bari
- Porta Matera
- Porta Foggiali
- Porta dei Martiri (also named "la Porticella")
- Porticella of via Marsala
- Porta del Carmine

One more gate was then added—Porta Santa Teresa—which was made "upon request of the Discalced Carmelites", who lived close to the nearby church Chiesa di Santa Teresa (the gate would allow the Carmelites to enter the city more easily). From the Carte Rocca P/33 the presence of a further gate can be inferred, which passed through Altamura Castle and which was more similar to a footbridge.

The demolition of the gates began as early as the 1820s. There are more details about the demolition of Porta Foggiali compared to the other gates, since there is a source stating that it can be traced back to sometime before 24 November 1823.

== Gallery ==
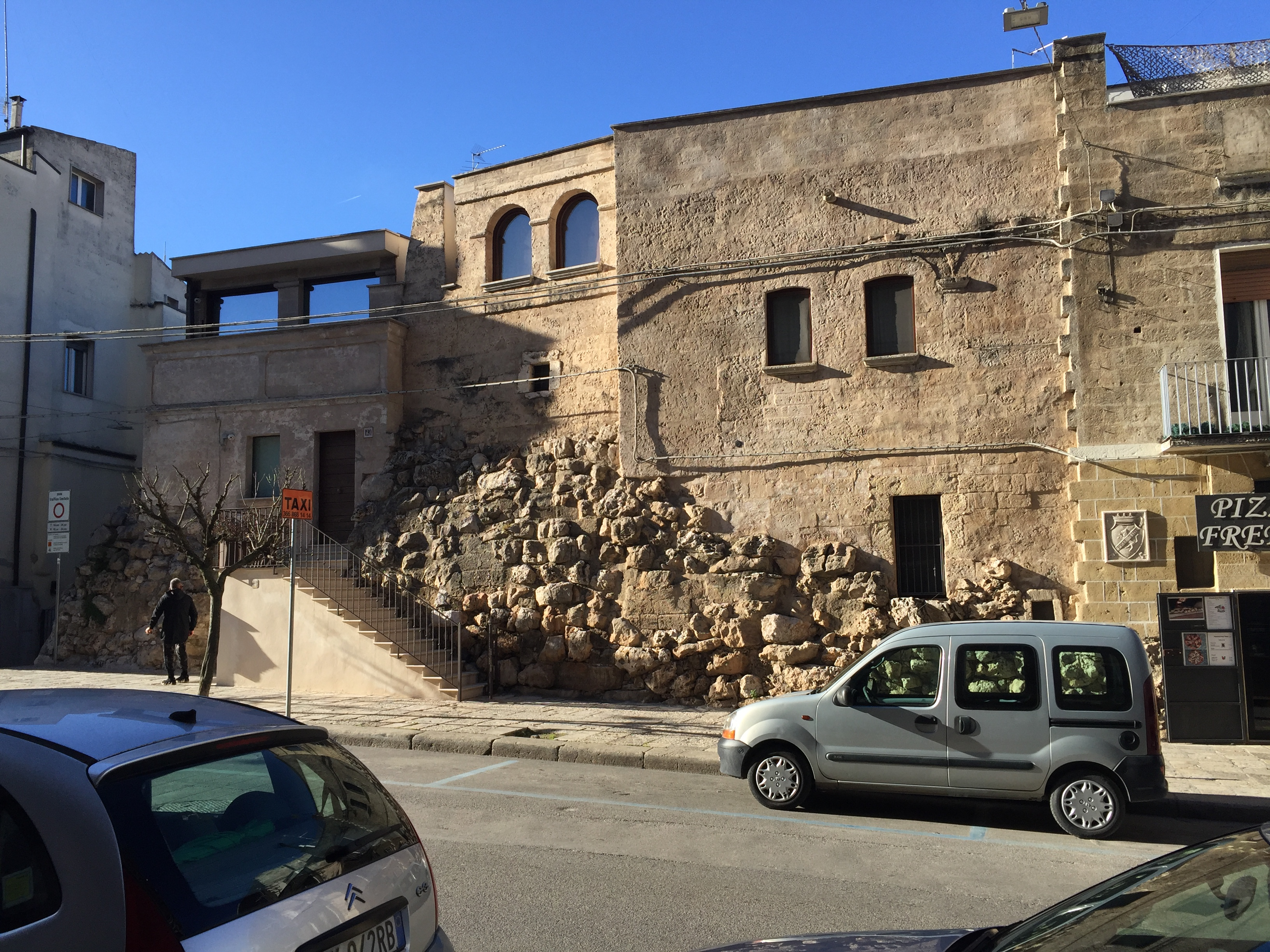
Remains of the city walls on Corso Umberto I - Intersection with the Megalithic Walls of Altamura.

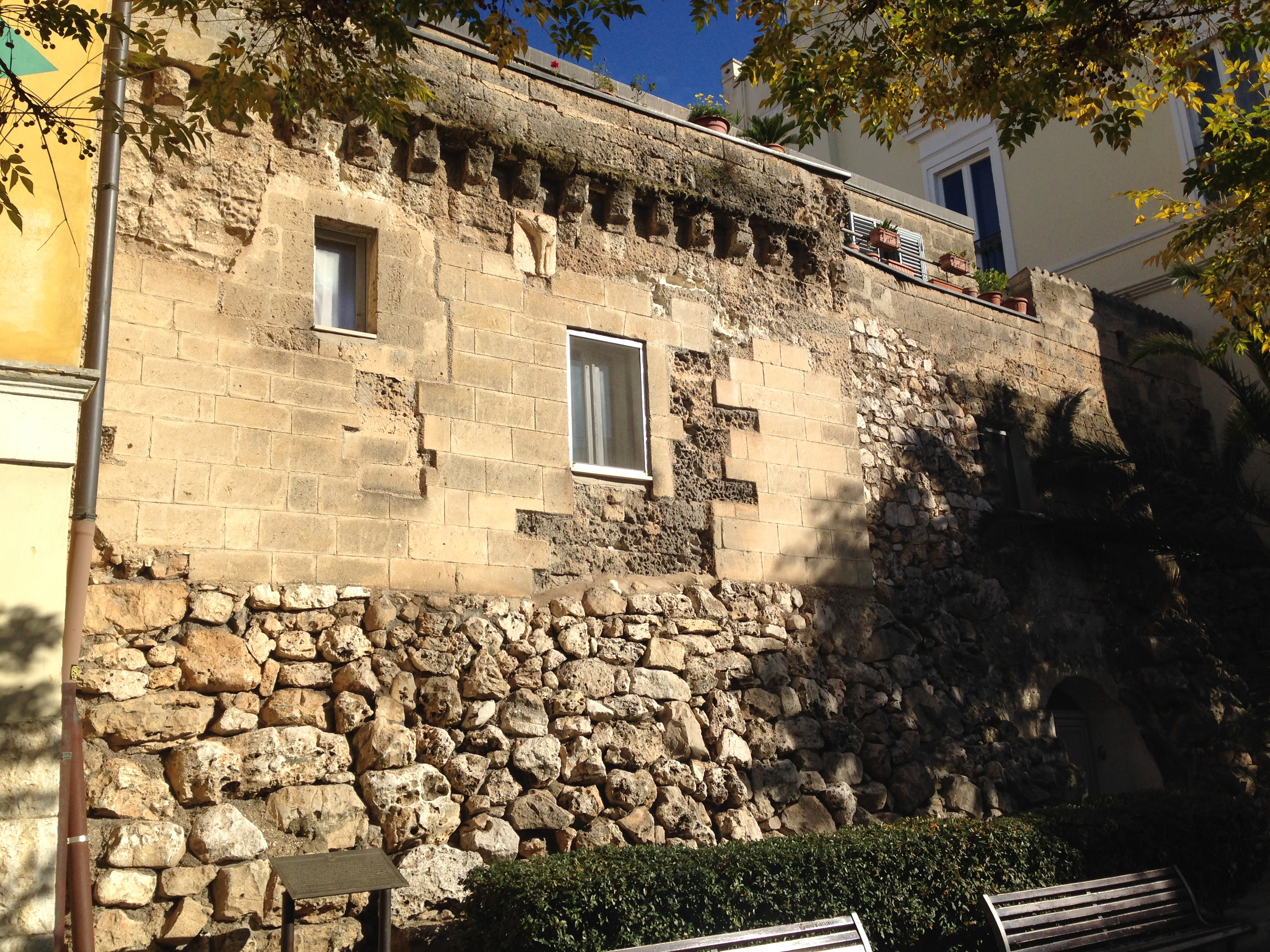
Remains near Porta Matera - Intersection with the Megalithic Walls of Altamura.

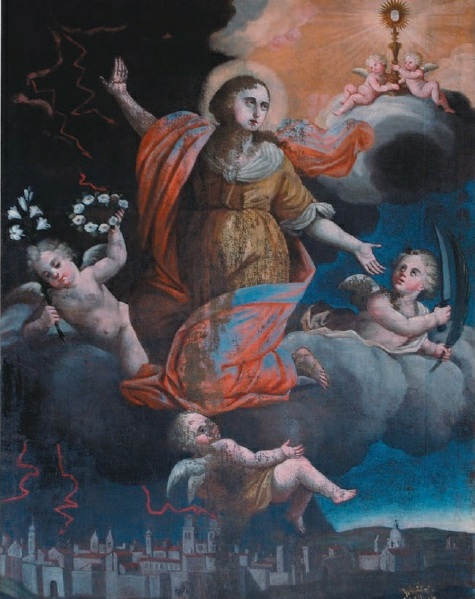
Porta Bari - Painting depicting Saint Irene with the City Walls of Altamura at the bottom - Sala Consigliare del Comune di Altamura.

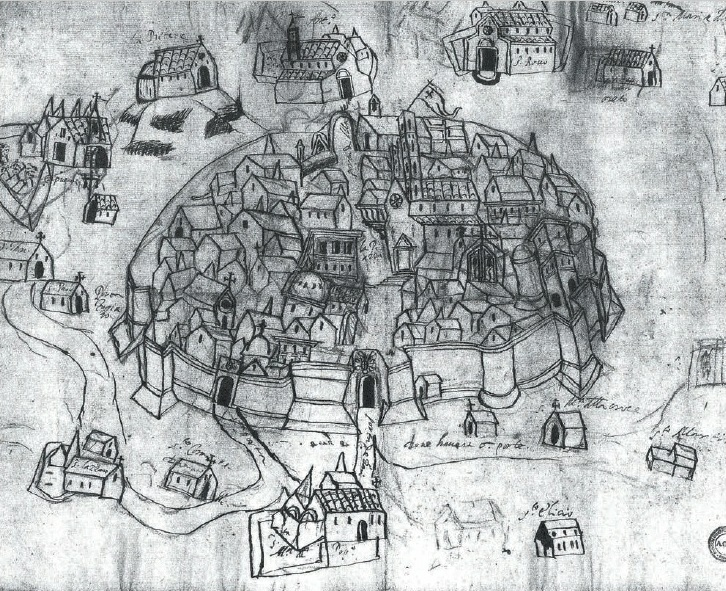
View of the city walls dating back to 16th century, taken from the Archivio Generalizio Agostiniano - Carte Rocca P/32 (Angelica Library).

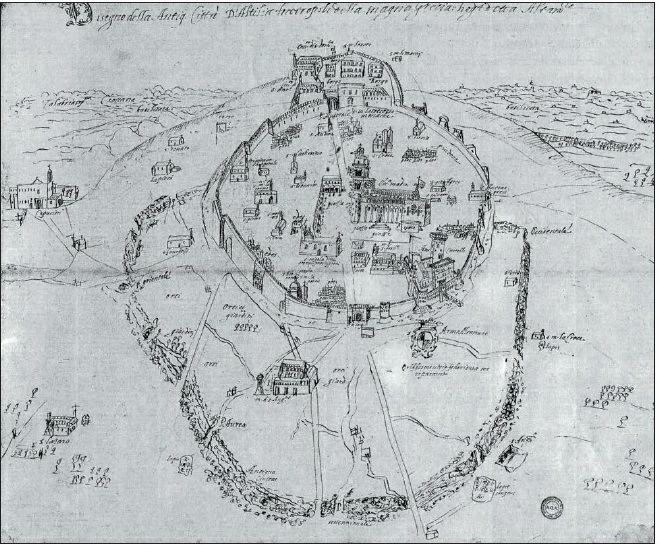
Another view of the city walls, intersecting with the much older Megalithic Walls of Altamura - Drawing dating back to the end of the 16th century and taken from Archivio Generalizio Agostiniano - Carte Rocca P/33 (Angelica Library).

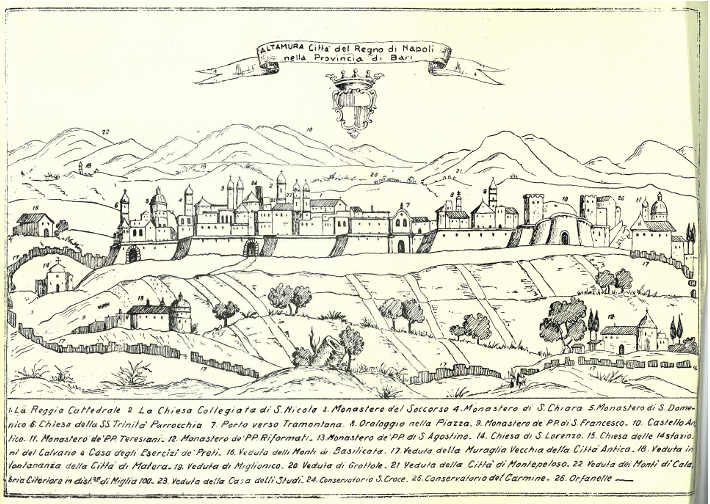
Lithograph depicting Altamura, taken from Cesare Orlandi's book Delle città d'Italia e sue isole adjacenti compendiose notizie (1770)

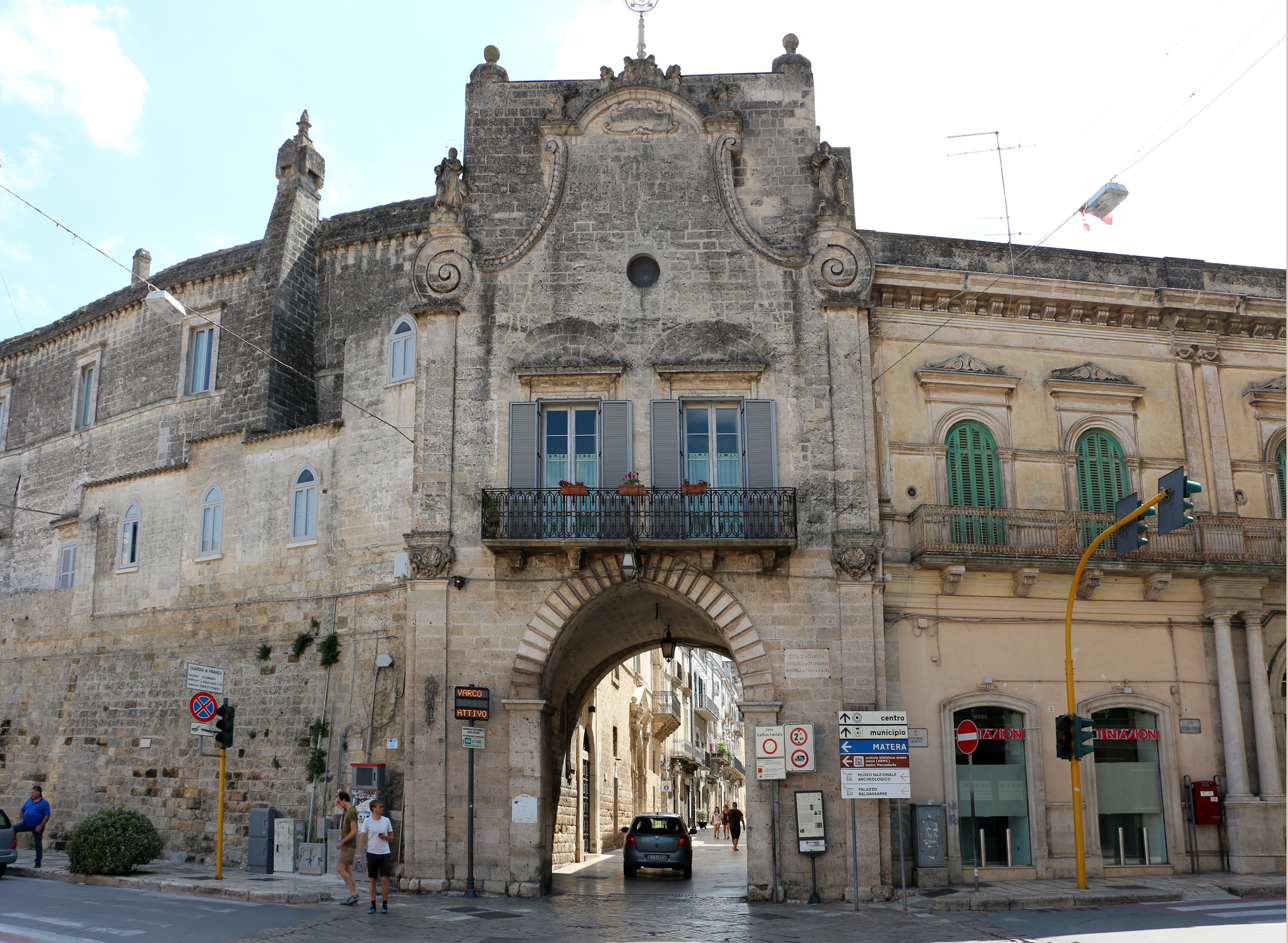
Porta Bari, the main gate of the city walls.

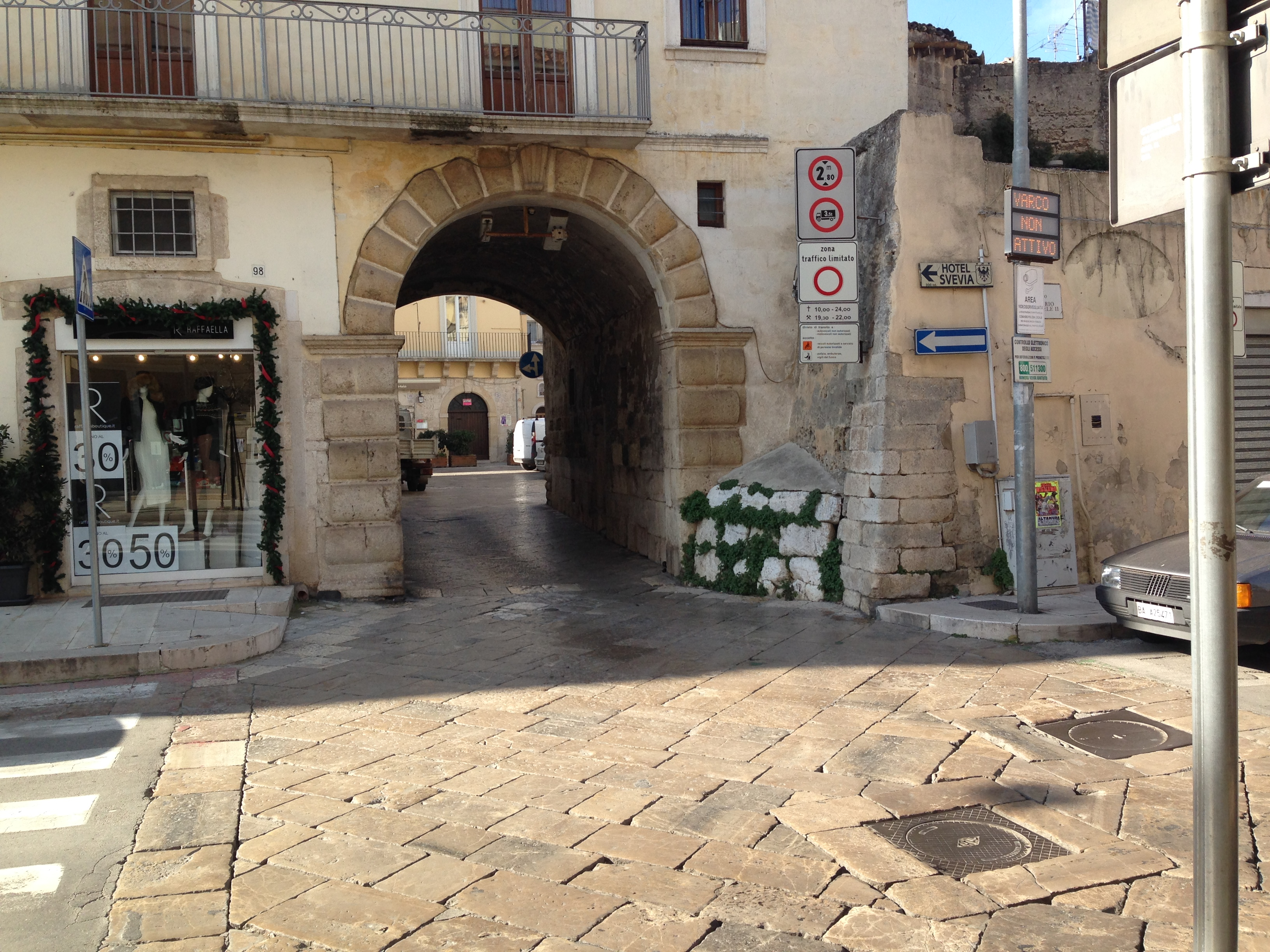
Porta dei Martiri, also known as "la Porticella".

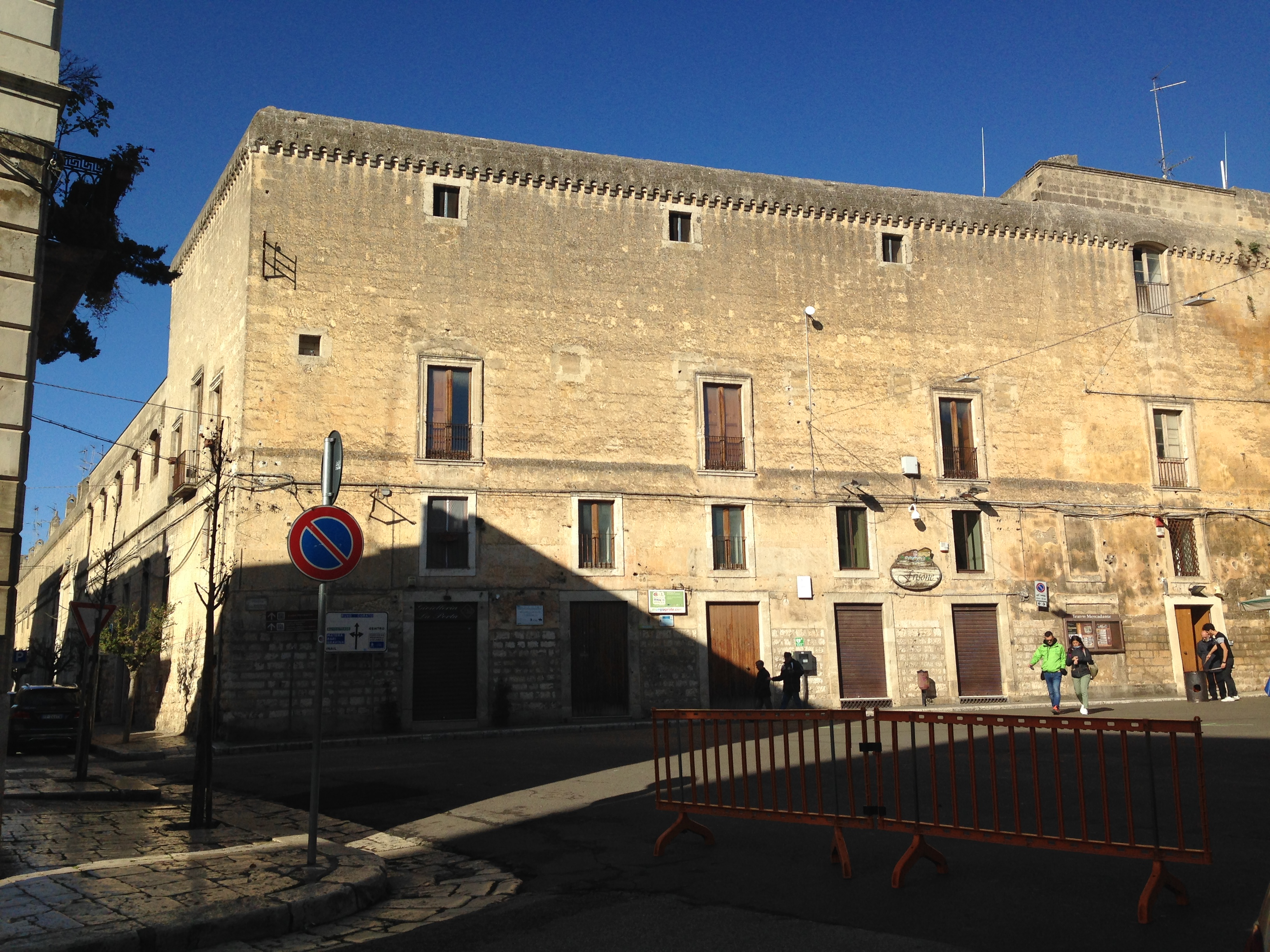
The monastery "Monastero del Soccorso", part of the city walls and close to Porta Matera

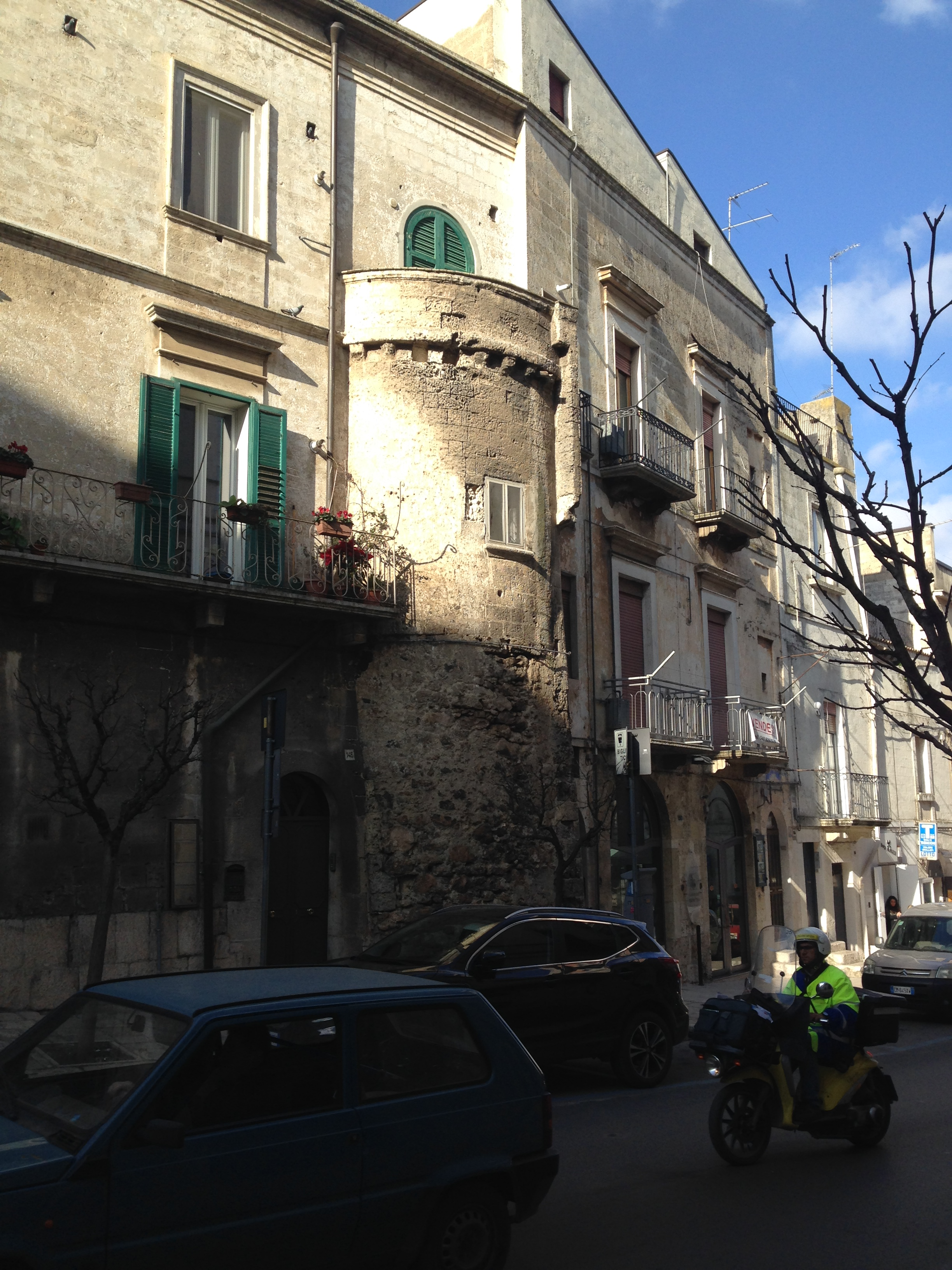
View of the tower located near the gate Porta Foggiali

== Bibliography ==
- Pupillo, Giuseppe; Operatori C.R.S.E.C. BA/7 (2017). Altamura, immagini e descrizioni storiche (PDF). Matera: Antezza Tipografi. ISBN 9788889313282. Archived from the original (PDF) on 21 October 2018.
- Angelo Massafra, ed. (2002). Patrioti e insorgenti in provincia: il 1799 in Terra di Bari e Basilicata. Edipuglia. pp. 422–423. ISBN 9788872283134.
