= Giovanni Pipino =

Giovanni Pipino may refer to:

- Giovanni Pipino da Barletta (died 1316), an Italian nobleman and dignitary of the Kingdom of Naples
- Giovanni Pipino di Altamura (died 1357), an Italian nobleman and condottiero of the Kingdom of Naples
