= Porta Matera =

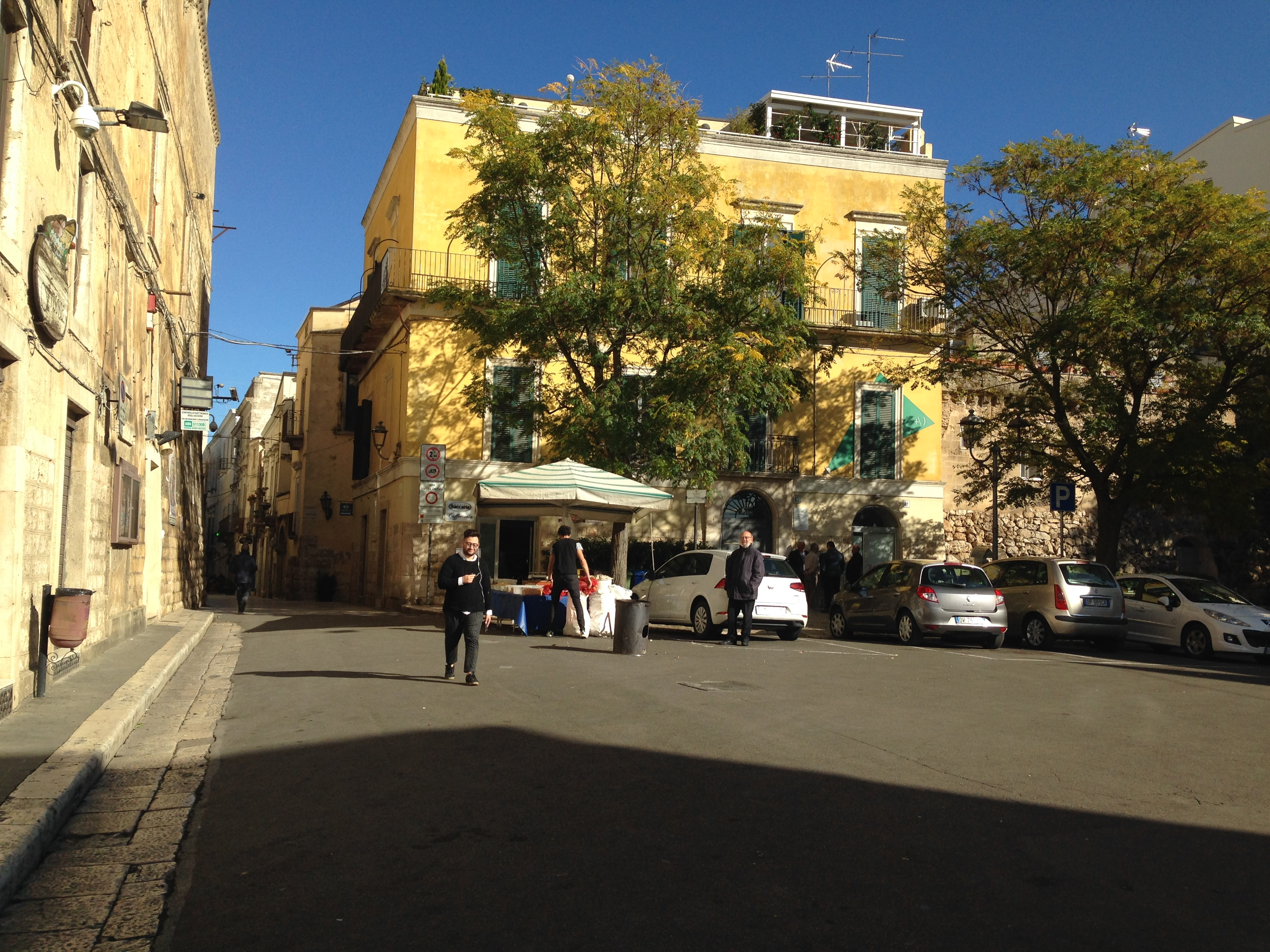
- The square where Porta Matera was located
- Interactive map of Porta Matera
- 40.825446°N 16.552813°E
- Type: Gate
- Location: Italy
- Nearest city: Altamura

History
- Built: Middle Ages
- Original use: One of the main gates of the City Walls of Altamura
- Demolished: 1872
- Rebuilt: 16th–17th centuries

Site notes
- Current use: One of the gates of Altamura's historic centre

Porta Matera was one of the main gates of the old city of Altamura. They were part of the City Walls of Altamura (dating back to Middle Ages and rebuilt in 1648), which were completely demolished during the nineteenth century since they had become useless for defence purposes. The gate itself was demolished in 1872. The monastery Monastero del Soccorso is located on the left side of the gate, while on the right some ruins of the city walls can be seen, presumably saved from destruction because of the bas-relief depicting "Pipino's leg" (relating to the killing and subsequent dismemberment of Giovanni Pipino di Altamura in the Middle Ages).

In the past, it was known as porta montium, which is Latin and it means "the gate that leads to the mountains" of Italian region Basilicata. Nowadays, the gate is known mostly because of the Altamuran Revolution (1799).

== Pipino's leg ==
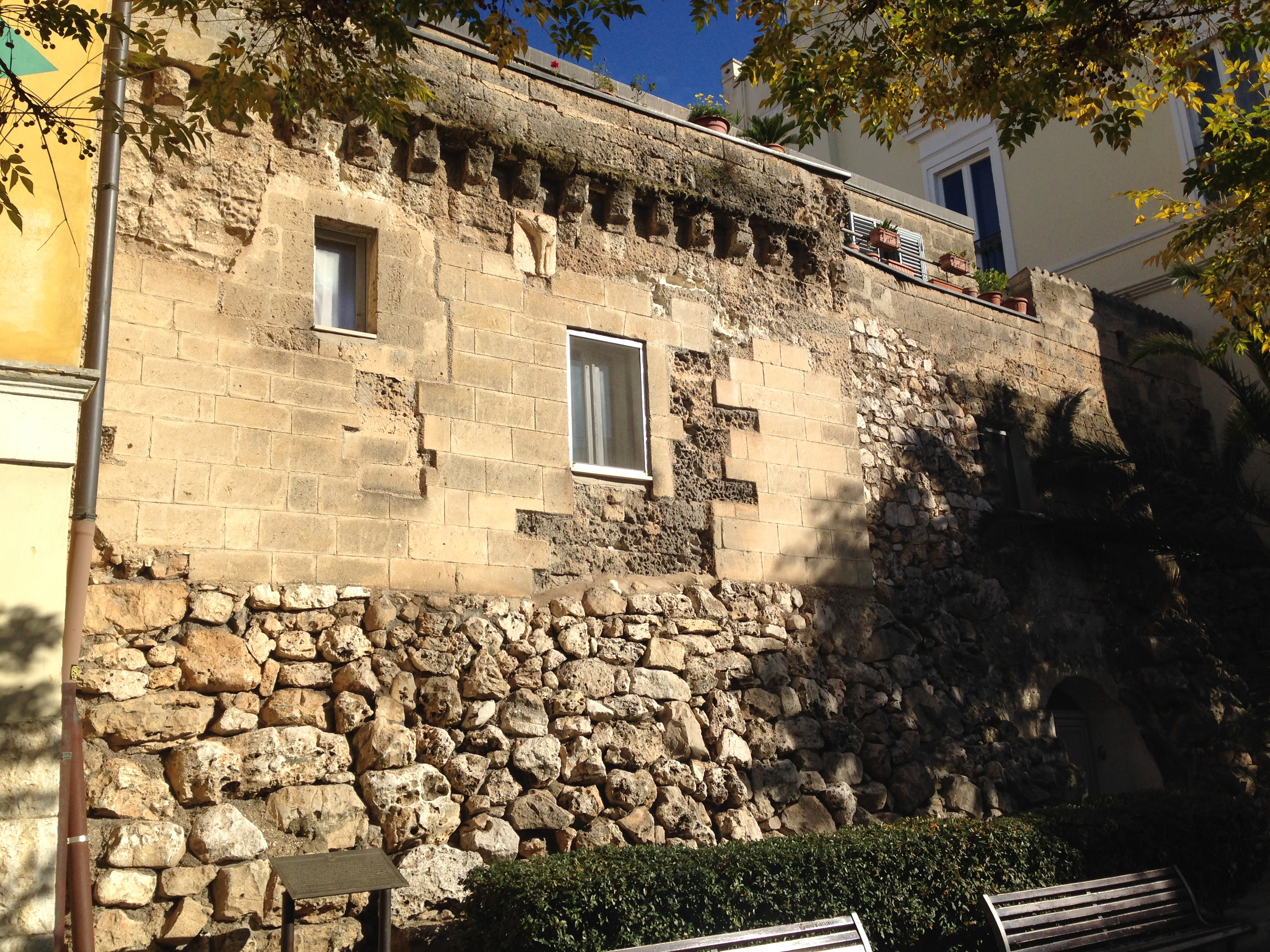
The bas-relief depicting "Pipino's leg"

Some ruins of the medieval city walls of Altamura (not to be confused with the Megalithic Walls of Altamura) are still visibile on the right side of Porta Matera. The ruins were not demolished probably because of the historical importance of the area: a leg of Giovanni Pipino di Altamura (1357) was exposed on that part of the city walls. Giovanni Pipino, because of his rebellious behavior, was hanged on the battlements of Altamura Castle and his body was later dismembered. His body parts were displayed inside the city as a warning to the population, and one of those was displayed on the left side of Porta Matera. In memory of this, a bas-relief ("Pipino's leg") was later made and placed on top of the walls; this bas-relief was then destroyed and rebuilt in 1648 during the restoration works of the city walls and it's still visible.

== The Altamuran Revolution ==
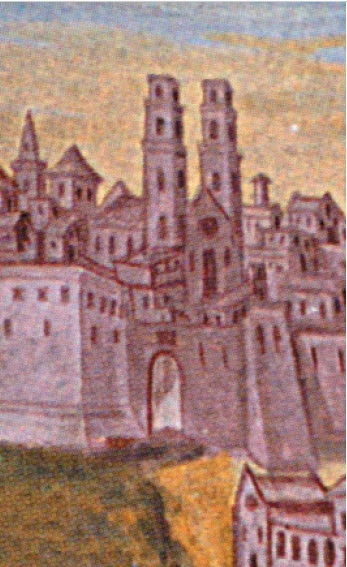
Detail of Porta Matera, taken from the painted ceiling of Palazzo arcivescovile, located in Matera (Salone degli stemmi); painted by Anselmo Palmieri di Polla in 1709 and discovered by Tommaso Berloco in 1973.

Porta Matera is known mainly for having been the gate through which the Sanfedisti, led by Cardinal Fabrizio Ruffo, penetrated into the city during the battle of the Altamuran Revolution (1799) (Neapolitan Republic of 1799). During this battle, many Altamurans and Sanfedisti were killed. Among those were Altamuran citizens Maurizio D'Alesio and Giuseppe Tubito, who were torn apart by a grenade explosion. Moreover, an old widow called "vedova Turco" was killed by Sanfedisti right after their entry into the city; her house was located close to Porta Matera and it was looted first by invaders. She was hit with sabers and closed into a lot that was then burnt; she was found after three days and healed by one of her relatives.

In the square in front of Porta Matera, Giovanni Firrao was also killed by Fabrizio Ruffo himself on the same day the Sanfedisti entered the city (10 May 1799).

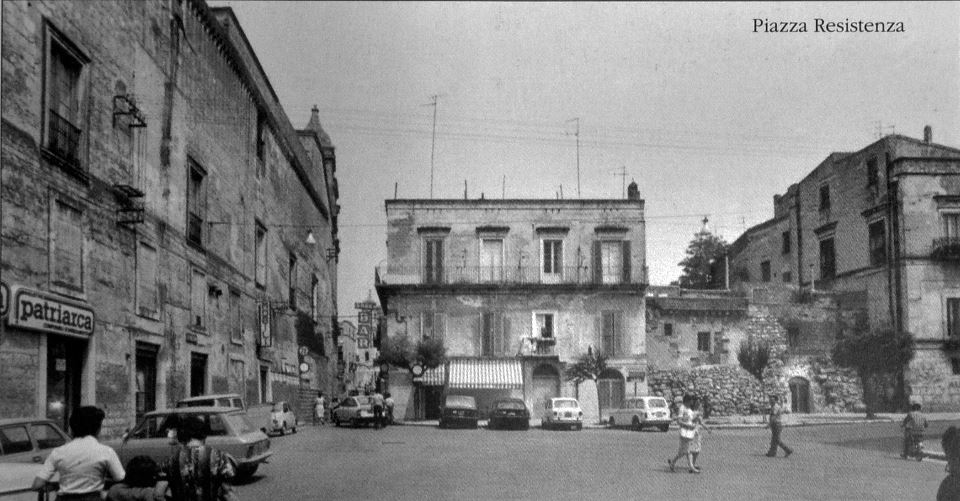
Porta Matera in the 20th century

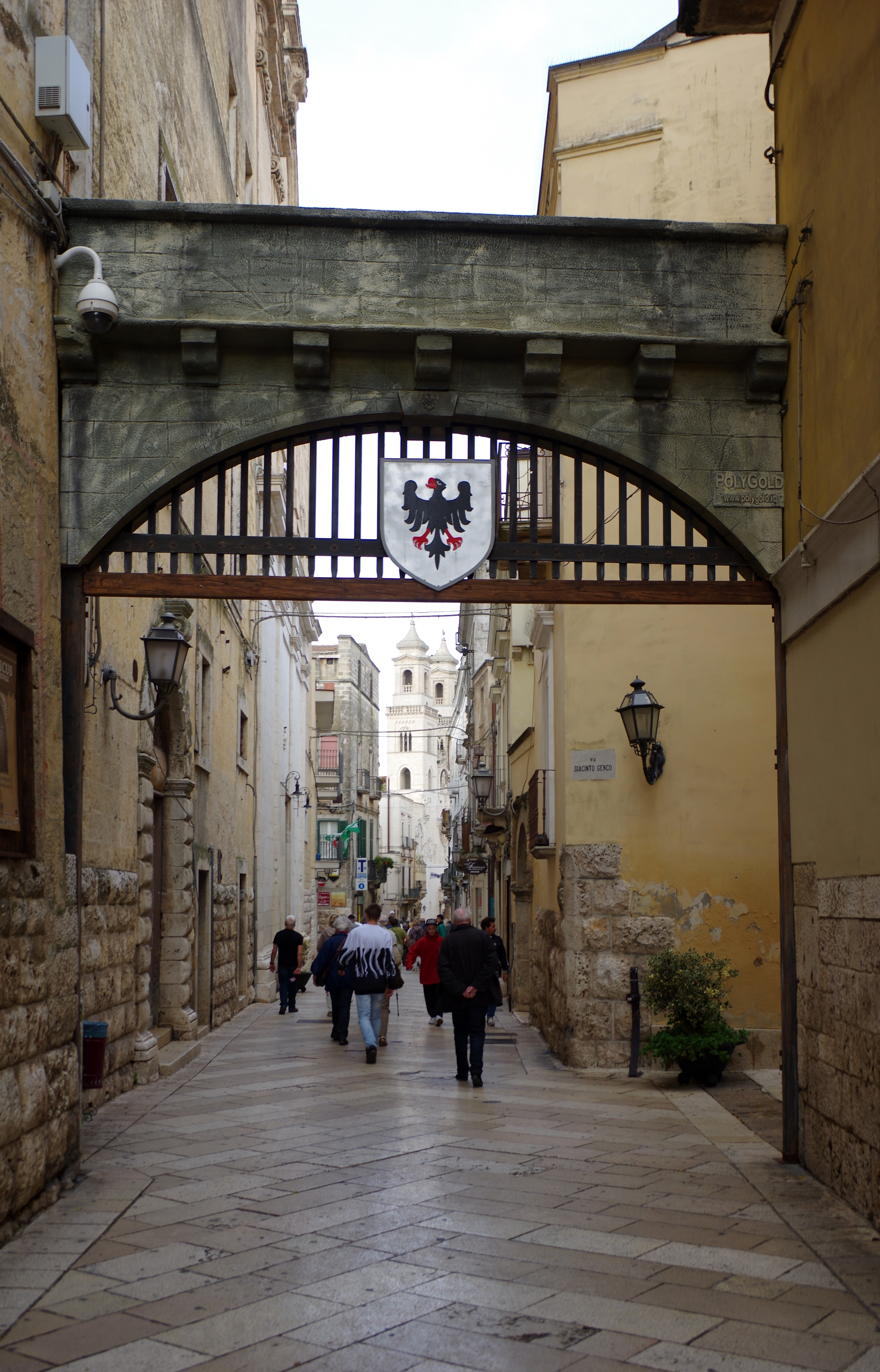
The gate of Porta Matera, rebuilt for the Renaissance fair Federicus

== Bibliography ==
- Anonimo (1828). Vita di Cola di Rienzo: tribuno del popolo romano. pp. 193–197.
- Matteo Villani (1562). Historia di Matteo Villani cittadino fiorentino il quale continua l'historie di Giouan Villani suo fratello, nella quale oltre a i quattro primi libri già stampati, sono aggiunti altri cinque nuouamente ritrouati, & hora mandati in luce. Et comincia dall'year 1348. Con due copiose tauole, l'una de' capitoli, l'altra delle cose. ad instanzia de' Giunti di Fiorenza.
- Antonino Cimbalo (1799). Itinerario di tutto ciò che è avvenuto durante la spedizione dell'eminentissimo signor D. Fabrizio Cardinal Ruffo. Napoli: Vincenzo Manfredi. pp. 23–27.
- Francesco Apa (1800). Brieve dettaglio di alcuni particolari avvenimenti accaduti nel corso della campagna nella spedizione dell'Eminentissimo Fabrizio Ruffo. Napoli: Vincenzo Manfredi.
- Vincenzo Durante (1800). Diario storico delle operazioni di guerra. Napoli: Vincenzo Manfredi. pp. 49–58.
- Giancarlo Berarducci; Vitangelo Bisceglia (1800). Giuseppe Ceci (ed.). Cronache dei fatti del 1799 (PDF). Bari. Archived from the original (PDF) on 20 October 2019.
- Domenico Petromasi (1801). Storia della spedizione dell'eminentissimo cardinale D. Fabrizio Ruffo, allora Vicario Generale per S.M. nel Regno di Napoli (PDF). Naples: Vincenzo Manfredi. pp. 31–39.
- Domenico Sacchinelli (1836). Sulla vita del cardinale Fabrizio Ruffo (PDF). Tipografia di Carlo Calanco.
- Ottavio Serena (1867). Alcuni fatti della Rivoluzione del 1799 (lettera del 1862 ad Alexandre Dumas padre). Napoli: Tipografia del Giornale di Napoli (strada Forno vecchio, 2).
- Giuseppe Bolognese (1999). Zecher la chorban – Memoria del sacrificio. Tipografia Castellano – Altamura.
- Angelo Massafra, ed. (2002). Patrioti e insorgenti in provincia: il 1799 in Terra di Bari e Basilicata. Edipuglia. pp. 422–423. ISBN 9788872283134.
- Vincenzo Vicenti (1998). Arcangela Vicenti e Giuseppe Pupillo (ed.). Medaglioni altamurani del 1799. Cassano Murge.
- Berloco, Tommaso (1985). Storie inedite della location di Altamura. ATA – Associazione Turistica Altamurana Pro Loco.
- Pupillo, Giuseppe; Operatori C.R.S.E.C. BA/7 (2017). Altamura, immagini e descrizioni storiche (PDF). Matera: Antezza Tipografi. ISBN 9788889313282. Archived from the original (PDF) on 21 October 2018.

== See also ==
- Porta Bari (Altamura)
- Altamura
- Altamuran Revolution
