= Black Turin =

- Directed by: Carlo Lizzani
- Screenplay by: Nicola Badalucco; Luciano Vincenzoni
- Story by: Nicola Badalucco; Luciano Vincenzoni
- Produced by: Dino De Laurentiis
- Starring: Nicola Di Bari; Bud Spencer; Andrea Balestri; Domenico Santoro
- Cinematography: Pasqualino De Santis
- Edited by: Franco Fraticelli
- Music by: Gian Franco Reverberi; Gian Piero Reverberi; Nicola Di Bari
- Production companies: Dino De Laurentiis International Manufacturing Company; Trianon Productions
- Distributed by: Metro-Goldwyn-Mayer
- Release dates: 28 September 1972 (Italy); 28 November 1973 (Paris)
- Running time: 105 minutes
- Countries: Italy; France
- Languages: Italian; French
- Budget: $810,000
- Box office: ₤858.820 million

Black Turin (Italian: Torino nera) is a 1972 crime film directed by Carlo Lizzani. The film received mixed reviews, but was commercially successful.

== Cast ==
- Bud Spencer: Rosario Rao
- Françoise Fabian: Lucia Rao
- Marcel Bozzuffi: Fridda
- Guido Leontini: Trotta
- Vittorio Duse: Camarata
- Nicola Di Bari: Mancuso
- Andrea Balestri: Raffaele Rao
- Domenico Santoro: Mino Rao
- Saro Urzì: Jaco
- Gigi Ballista: Marinotti
- Maria Baxa: Nascarella

== Release ==
Black Turin was released in Italy as Torino nera on 25 September 1972 where it was distributed by MGM. The film grossed a total of 858,820,000 Italian lire domestically. It was released in Paris on 28 November 1973 under the title La vengeance du sicilien.

== Notes ==
=== References ===
- Curti, Roberto (2013). Italian Crime Filmography, 1968-1980. McFarland. ISBN 978-0786469765.
