= Francesco Cassiano de Silva =

Spanish engraver

- Born: 17th century
- Died: 18th century
- Occupation: engraver

Francesco Cassiano de Silva (17th century- 18th century) was a Spanish engraver. His engravings mainly depicted some cities of the Kingdom of Naples and they represent an invaluable source of information on the history of Southern Italy.

== Life ==
Very little is known about the life of Francesco Cassiano de Silva. He was well known in the Kingdom of Naples as an engraver of pictures for printed books. In particular, his pictures were published in the most important Naples publishers of that time, namely Antonio Bulifon, Domenico Antonio Parrino and Luigi Mutio. He also collaborated with Italian historian Giovan Battista Pacichelli. According to some sources, Cassiano de Silva was from Milan (Italy), while, according to other sources, he was Spanish.

The contemporary scholar who first discovered one of his works is Vladimiro Valerio: he discovered in the Austrian National Library the album titled Regno Napolitano anatomizzato dalla penna di D. Francesco Cassiano De Silva. In 1986, another scholar, Giancarlo Alisio, discovered a geographical atlas with drawings drawn by de Silva himself inside the Biblioteca Nazionale Italiana, while in 2006 scholars Amirante and Pessolano made further discoveries inside the Kriegsarchiv, Vienna, and in the National Archives of Austria (Österreichisches Staatsarchiv). A further discovery was made in the Lázaro Galdiano Museum in Madrid (in this last case, the drawings were about the Kingdom of Spain).

== Works by Cassiano de Silva ==
- Accuratissima e nuova delineazione del Regno di Napoli. Antonio Bulifon. 1692.
- Descrizione delle città vescovali di tutto questo Regno di Napoli, e di alcune terre grosse disegnate al naturale, contenuto in Regno Napolitano anatomizzato dalla penna di D. Francesco Cassiano De Silva (1698).
- Discorso sopra le città del Regno di Napoli, contenuto in Regno Napolitano anatomizzato dalla penna di D. Francesco Cassiano De Silva.
- Giovan Battista Pacichelli (1703). Il Regno di Napoli in prospettiva diviso in dodeci provincie. Naples.

== See also ==
- Porta Matera
- Altamura

== Bibliography ==
- Pupillo, Giuseppe; Operatori C.R.S.E.C. BA/7 (2017). Altamura, immagini e descrizioni storiche (PDF). Matera: Antezza Tipografi. ISBN 9788889313282.
