= Porta Bari (Altamura) =

Gate in the old city wall of Altamura, Italy

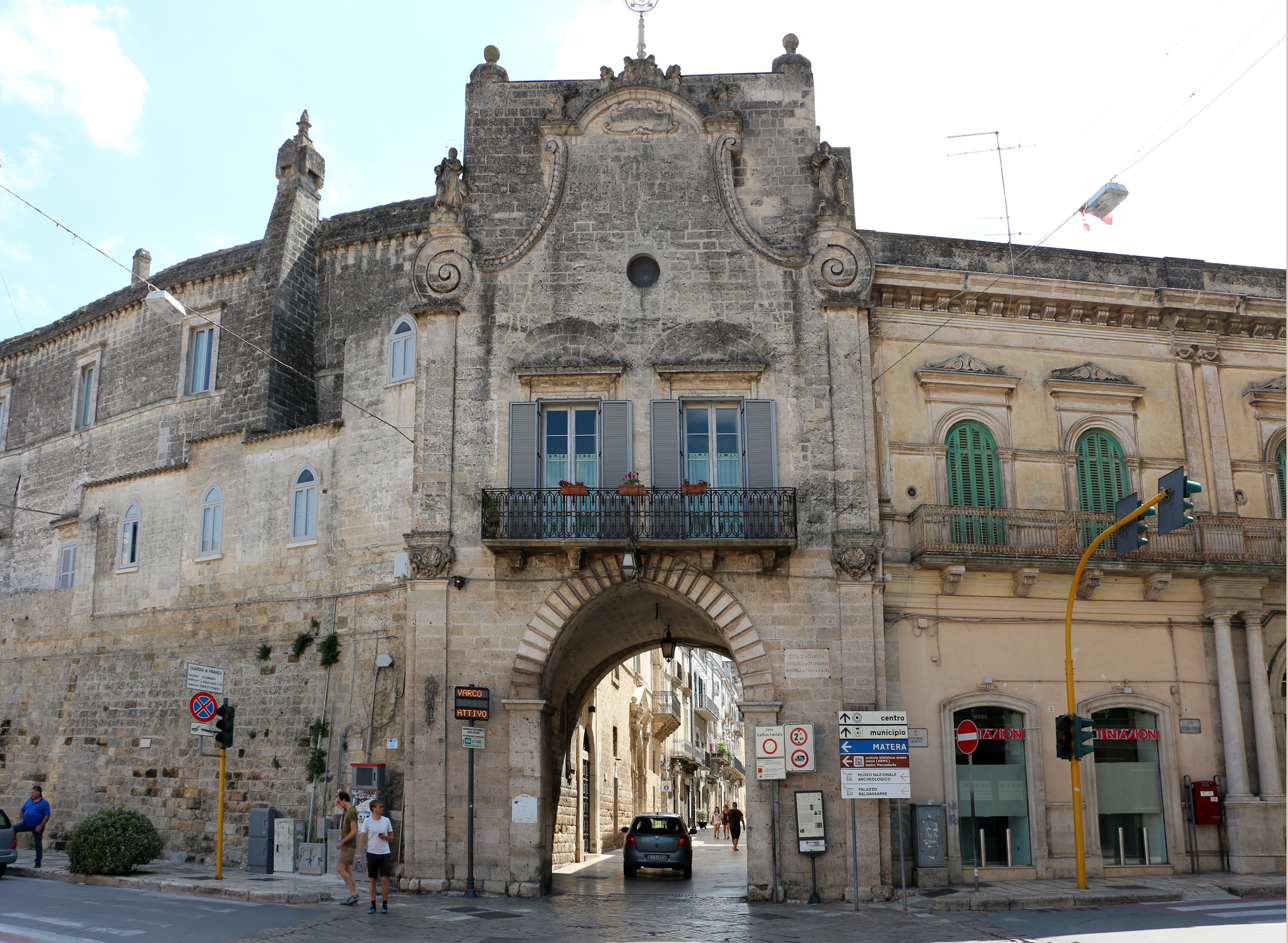
- Porta Bari and the nearby palace Palazzo De Angelis-Viti (on the left)
- Interactive map of Porta Bari
- 40.829656°N 16.553928°E
- Type: Gate
- Location: Italy
- Nearest city: Altamura

History
- Built: Middle Ages
- Original use: One of the main gates of the City Walls of Altamura (starting from the Middle Ages)
- Rebuilt: 16th-17th centuries

Site notes
- Current use: One of the gates of Altamura's historic centre

Porta Bari (Italian: [ˈpɔrta ˈbaːri]), previously called Porta de Bari, was one of the main gates of the city of Altamura, before the city walls of the city were torn down over the 19th century. Similarly to most European cities (such as Vienna), the city walls were torn down, because the new technology and military techniques employed starting from the 19th century made them useless for defense purposes.

== History ==
The gate, as it appears today, was built between the 16th and 17th centuries. The previous gate was quite different from today. Before it was rebuilt, on top of the gate there used to be a small church, the chiesetta di SS. Annunziata. The first evidence of the existence of this small church dates back to the 1490, and it was super portam de Bari (Latin, i.e. "on top of Porta Bari"); documents about visits to the church by archdeacons testify that the church had some issues, since it could be reached only through an uncomfortable ladder and it was located above one of the main gates of the city.

On top of the gate is a stone inscription, attributed to Saint Alphonsus Liguori

V'adoro ogni momento
O vivo pan del ciel
Gran sagramento

The inscription is a reference to the Eucharist. On top of the whole building, a monstrance is clearly visible. Originally, the monstrance was made of stone (more precisely, of Mazzaro stone, like the whole building). In 1939, for the first Diocesan eucharistic congress, the stone monstrance was removed and replaced with a steel monstrance.

Outside of this gate, on 22 March 1799 (during the Altamuran Revolution of 1799), Altamura's "civic guard" (guardia civica) welcomed the new governo dipertimentale "parading with the beating of drums and the French and national flags". The gate is also known because, on the night between 9 and 10 May 1799 (during the same Altamuran Revolution), most Altamurans managed to flee from Fabrizio Ruffo and the Sanfedisti army through this gate, which wasn't then surveilled by guards.

The gate, together with the above building, wasn't destroyed in the 19th century presumably because of its beauty or because it was inseparable from the nearby palace Palazzo De Angelis-Viti. The gate and the palace haven't been restored to their original whiteness yet (as done with Altamura Cathedral), although it is the first historical building that tourists see when they enter the city.

== Gallery ==
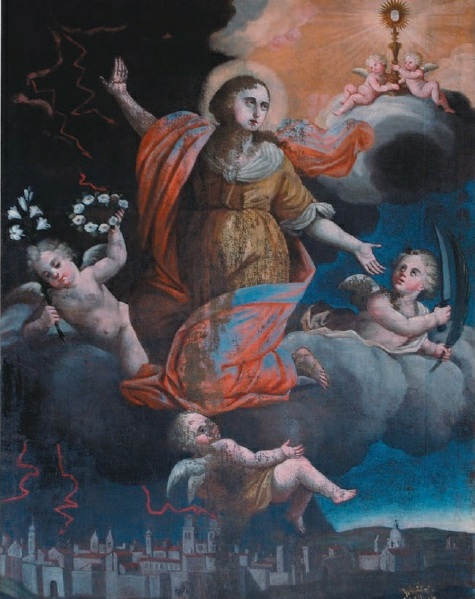
Porta Bari - Painting depicting Saint Irene of Lecce - Sala Consigliare del Comune di Altamura (the city is at the bottom)

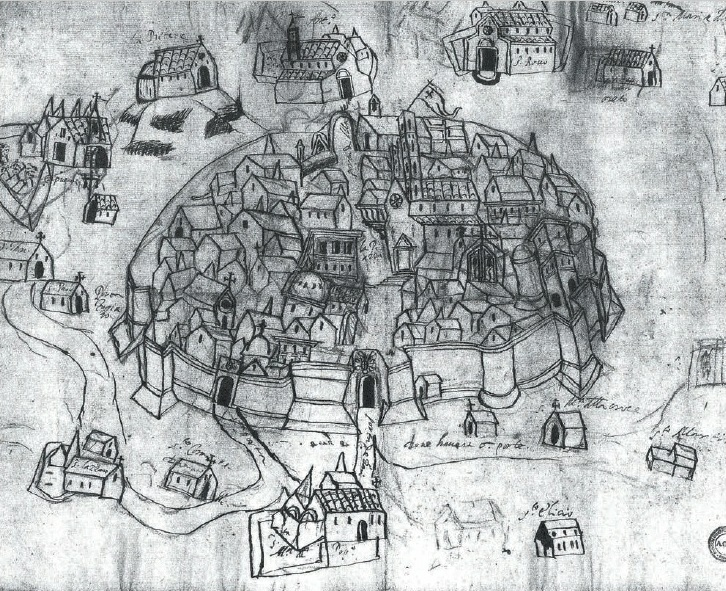
View of the City Walls of Altamura and porta Bari - Painting stored inside Archivio Generalizio Agostiniano, Carte Rocca P32 (Angelica Library)

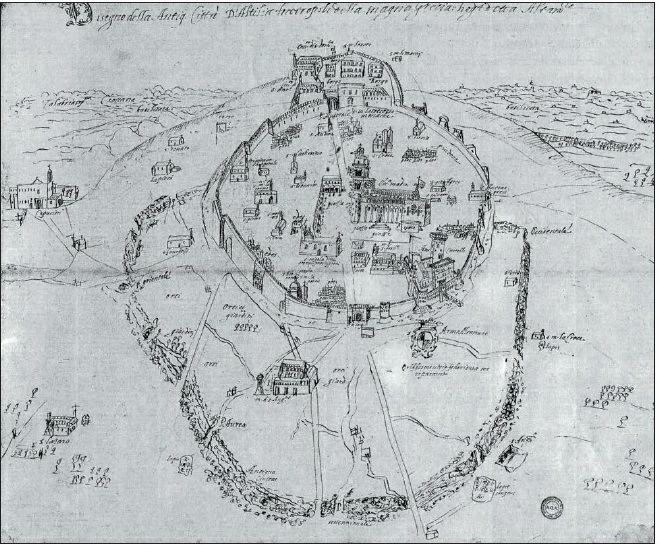
Another view - Painting stored inside Archivio Generalizio Agostiniano, Carte Rocca P33 (Angelica Library)

== Bibliography ==
- Pupillo, Giuseppe; Operatori C.R.S.E.C. BA/7 (2017). Altamura, immagini e descrizioni storiche (PDF). Matera: Antezza Tipografi. ISBN 9788889313282. Archived from the original (PDF) on 2018-10-21.
- Berloco, Tommaso (1985). Storie inedite della città di Altamura. ATA - Associazione Turistica Altamurana Pro Loco.
- Orlandi, Cesare (1770). Delle città d'Italia e sue isole adjacenti [sic] compendiose notizie - Tomo primo.
- Giuseppe Bolognese (1999). Zecher la chorban - Memoria del sacrificio. Tipografia Castellano - Altamura.
- Giancarlo Berarducci; Vitangelo Bisceglia (1800). Giuseppe Ceci (ed.). Cronache dei fatti del 1799 (PDF). Bari.

== See also ==
- Porta Matera
- Megalithic Walls of Altamura
- Altamura
- Epitaph of Altamura
- Altamura Man
- Altamura Bread
