= Piazza del Duomo, Altamura =

Public square in Altamura, Italy

Piazza del Duomo
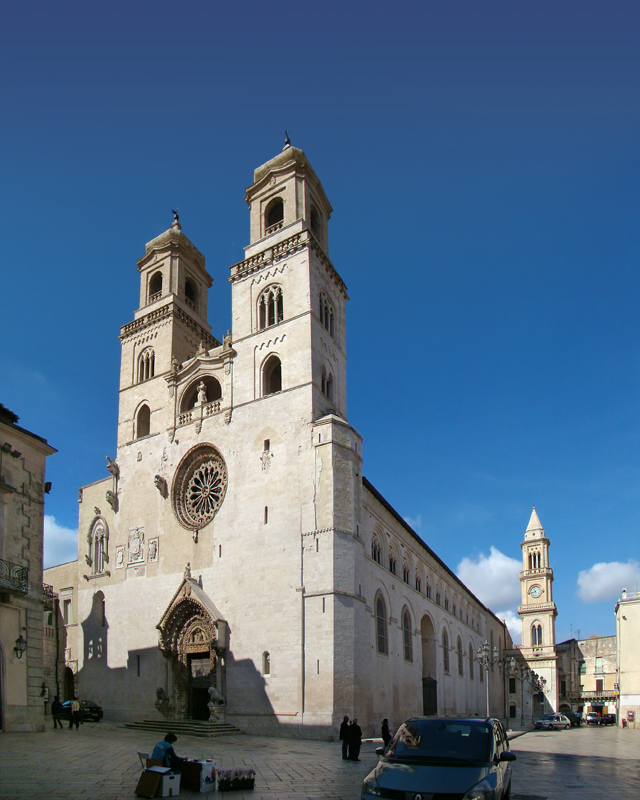
- Piazza del Duomo, the square where Altamura Cathedral is located
- Interactive map of Piazza del Duomo
- Native name: Piazza del Duomo (Italian)
- Former names: piazza delle Spezierie, platea rerum venalium, piazza del Mercato
- Type: Square
- Location: Altamura, Italy
- Postal code: 70022
- Coordinates: 40.827466°N 16.553237°E

Construction
- Construction start: 1494

Piazza del Duomo (also piazza Duomo) is the main square of the city of Altamura, Italy. It is located in the center of the historic city center, as well as in the middle of the main street of the city, that is corso Federico II di Svevia. Moreover, Altamura Cathedral, the main church of the city, is located on the square. It is also known because the Tree of Liberty was planted in this square during the so-called Altamuran Revolution (1799).

== History ==
The square has always been in the center of the city of Altamura, both in terms of position and importance. One of the most crucial decisions about the square is undoubtedly the intervention of Frederick of Naples who, in 1494, bought several houses located in the area where today is the square and had them demolished in order to enlarge the square.

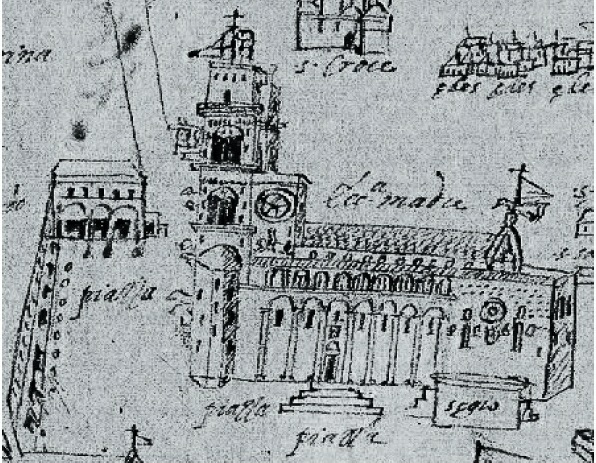
The cathedral, shown in drawing P/33 of Carte Rocca, kept in Angelica Library, Rome

At the time it was known because there was an important daily market and the prices of foodstuffs were decided inside the square. Moreover, in front of the entrance of Altamura Cathedral (the area of the current palazzo Melodia), there was a refuge for the poor, known as hospitium maioris ecclesie. In the 16th century, the premises were turned into ten shops with arcades and it remained property of the cathedral, which rented the premises according to emphyteusis to private individuals. The existence of those ten shops is also confirmed by the drawing P/33, dating back to the late 16th century and stored in the Angelica Library of Rome; the doors in the drawing are exactly ten. In the 18th century, the shops were the only place where meat could be bought in the city, because of the tax on meat to be paid to the cathedral.

As shown in the same drawing (P/33) of Angelo Rocca, today's clock tower hadn't been built at that time yet. It was built in 1858 based on a project by the architect Corradino de Judicibus. Previously, in the same place where today it is the clock tower there was the seggio, a sort of stage in which the representatives of both nobles and commoners met in order to discuss the issues the city had to face. Initially, the seggio was located in the area of the current chapel of San Biagio (alongside the Church of San Nicola dei Greci); in the end of the 16th century, it was moved to the area where the clock tower is located now; in 1654, it was demolished and rebuilt in the same place.

Close to the area of the current clock tower, Altamura Cathedral also had an additional rose window as well as normal windows; al of them were walled and they are no longer visible.

== A fight ==
On July 1, 1580, a fight broke out in the square, which involved Epifanio Corrado and Graziano Filo. The two contenders died of the injuries caused by sword blows and stone throws. Graziano Filo first attacked Epifanio Corrado, "who wounded fell to the caissons of the square, where the fruits were sold". After a few days, Graziano Filo also died because of the stabs received and the wounds to the head.

== The statue of Astraea ==
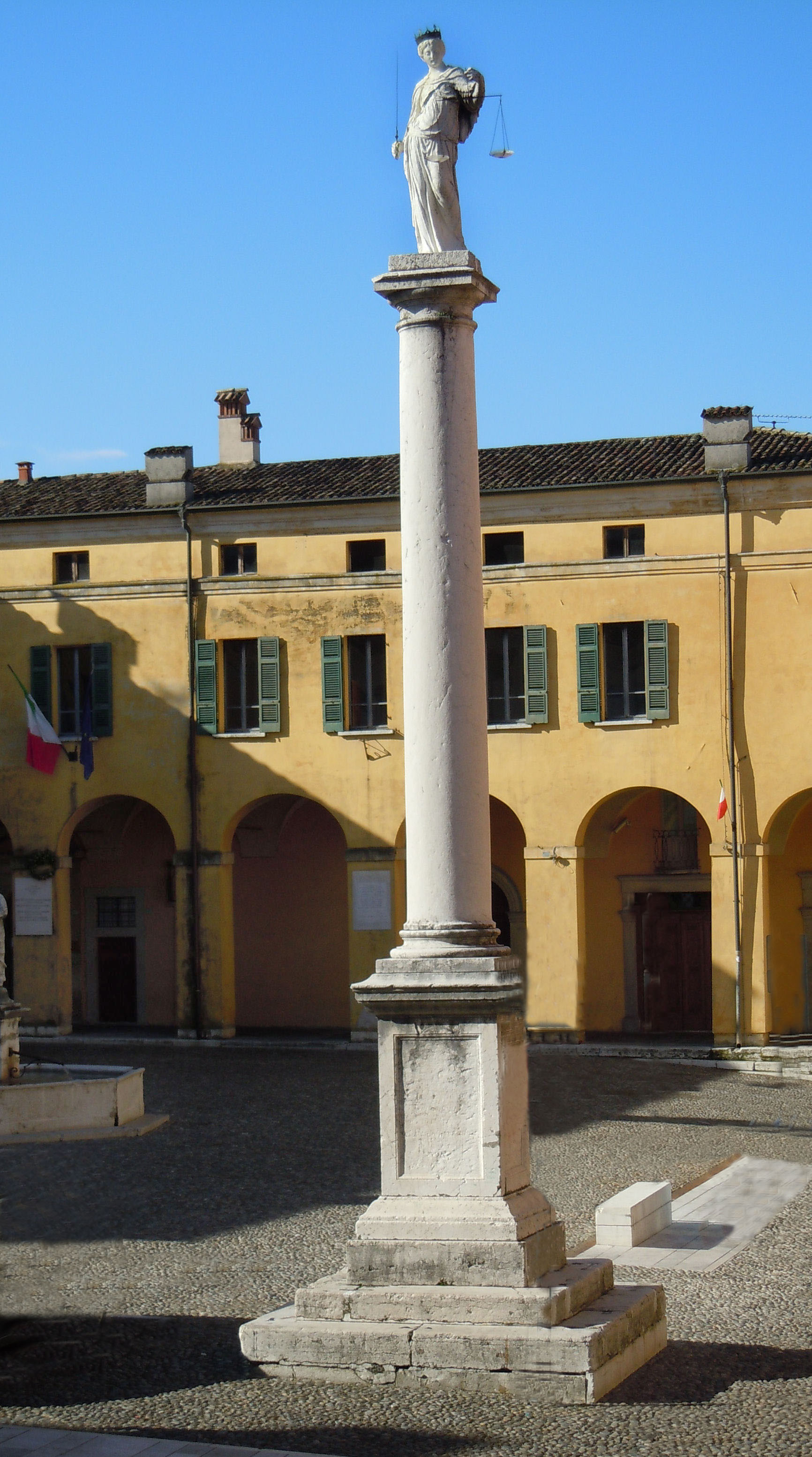
Castiglione delle Stiviere, a statue of Astraea holding a scale and a sword, and wearing a diadem

Cesare Orlandi, in his work Delle città d'Italia (1770), wrote that in the square there was a statue of goddess Astraea, denoting justice and peace, on a very high pedestal and it was located "at the bottom of the square". In the same work, it is described as the "Genius of Altamura". The goddess held a scale with her left hand and a sword with her right hand. She also wore a diadem on her head. The inscription Justitia & Pax osculatae sunt accompanied the monument. The statue is not present anymore, and its demolition date is unknown.

== Gallery ==
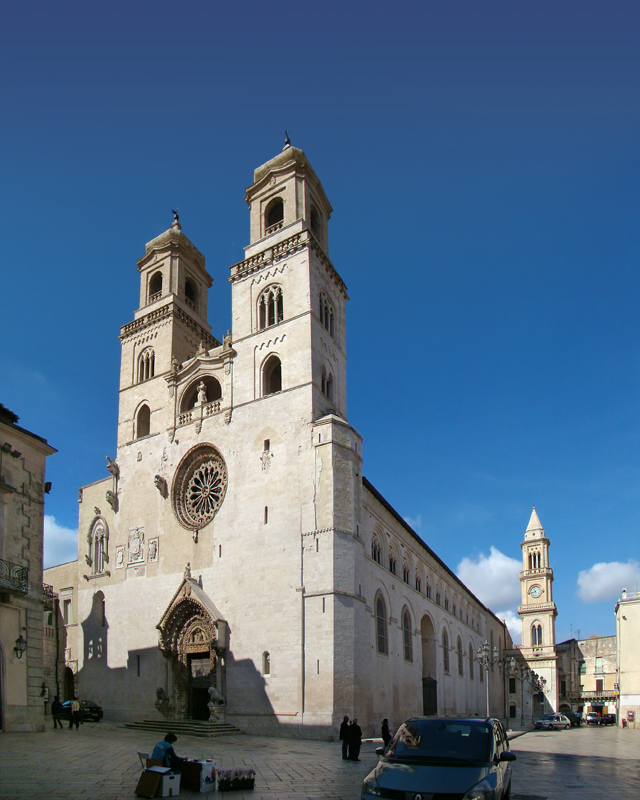
Altamura Cathedral

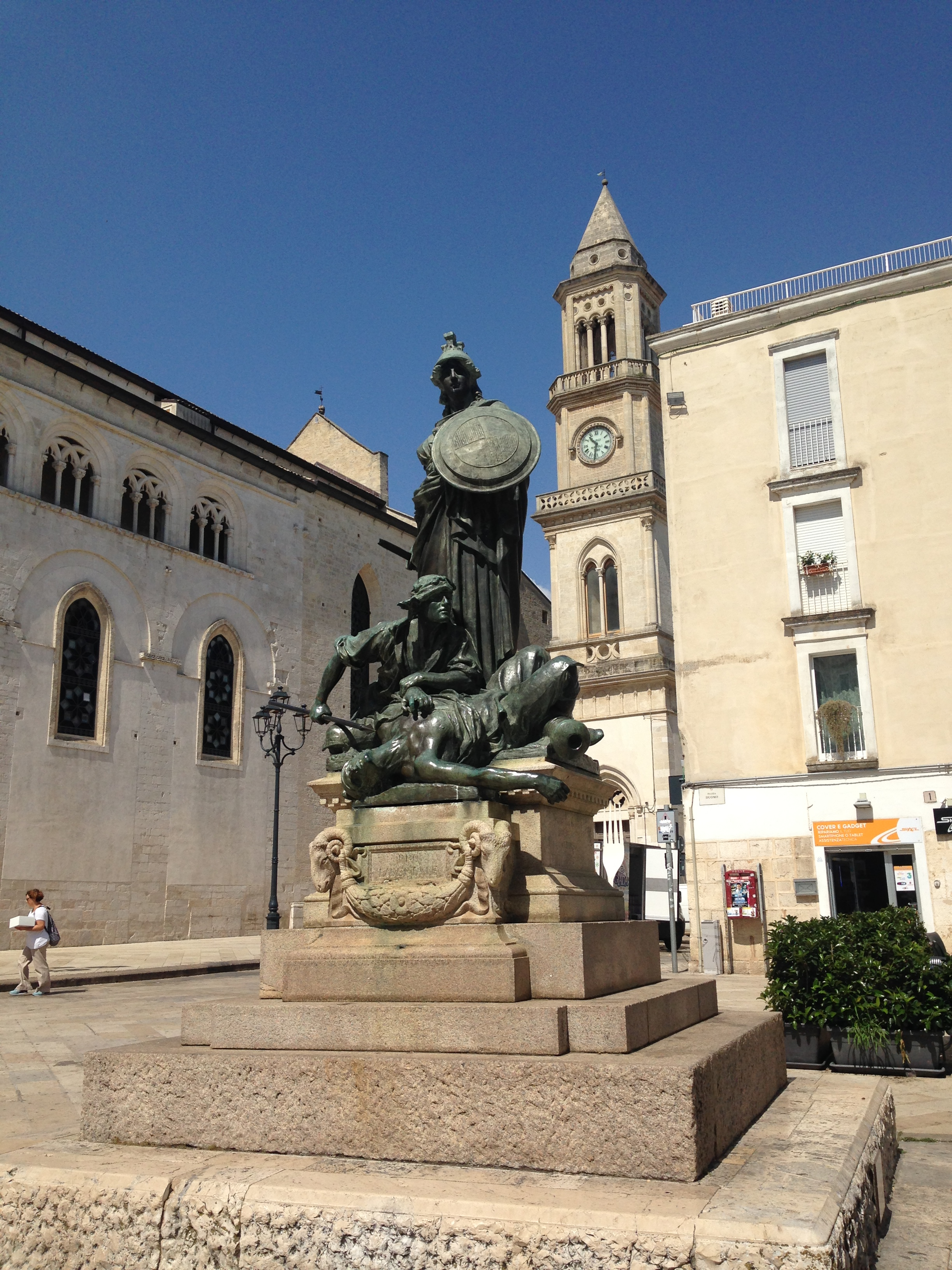
Monument to the martyrs of the Revolution of 1799 - Arnaldo Zocchi (1899)

== See also ==
- Altamura
- Altamura Cathedral
- Altamuran Revolution
- Archivio Biblioteca Museo Civico

== Bibliography ==
- Pupillo, Giuseppe; Operatori C.R.S.E.C. BA/7 (2017). Altamura, immagini e descrizioni storiche (PDF). Matera: Antezza Tipografi. ISBN 9788889313282. Archived from the original (PDF) on 2018-10-21.
- Giuseppe Bolognese (1999). Zecher la chorban - Memoria del sacrificio. Tipografia Castellano - Altamura.
