= Giovanni Pipino da Barletta =

- Coat of arms
- Died: August 30, 1316; Naples, Kingdom of Naples
- Buried: Church of San Pietro a Majella (Naples)
- Noble family: Pipino family

Giovanni Pipino da Barletta (Giovanni Pipino I or just Giovanni Pipino, Latin: Iohannes Pipinus) (death: Naples, 1316) was an Italian nobleman and dignitary of the Kingdom of Naples. He started the Pipino noble family, which, after just a few decades, disappeared with the death (or exile) of his grandson Giovanni Pipino di Altamura and his brothers.

In his youth, he helped the Giudice Razionale Giozzolino della Marra in his job and he's often been mistakenly defined a notary or even an architect (because of his patronage in the construction of churches and other buildings); his first real job was Maestro Razionale (a sort of accountant of the kingdom). Later, because of his expertise, he was also appointed court dignitary and secretary for the financial matters of the whole Kingdom of Naples. He was known and appreciated by the kings he served because of his loyalty and high expertise in the financial matters.

Over his life, he served three kings, namely Charles I of Anjou, Charles II of Naples and Robert of Anjou, and, by serving them, the Pipino family became one of the wealthiest and most notable families of the kingdom; he was also appointed miles, thus being allowed into the circle of noblemen of the Kingdom of Naples. He was also asked by the king Charles II of Naples to lead the destruction of the last Islamic stronghold of the Kingdom of Naples, i.e. the city of Lucera, and the killing or enslavement of the last Muslim community of Southern Italy (1300). In that situation, though he had no experience as a war strategist, he provided evidence of his high skills and managed to carry out the duty assigned by king Charles II of Naples.

Giovanni Pipino da Barletta died in 1316 in Naples; his tomb is located inside the church of San Pietro a Majella, in Naples. On top of the tomb is a statue probably depicting him; the coat of arms of the Pipino family is also visible.

== Coat of arms ==
The coat of arms of the Pipino family is shown in the sepulcher of Giovanni Pipino da Barletta (in the church of San Pietro a Majella, Naples). On a gray background there is a light blue transverse band with three golden shells placed on it. The coat of arms is also visible inside the castle of Minervino Murge, ma it's been partly damaged, probably by his grandchildren's enemies.

== Family ==
- Nicola Pipino (father)
- Sibilla de Virgiliis (wife)
- Nicola Pipino (son)
- Niccolò Pipino (son)
- Angiola Pipino (daughter)
- Margherita Pipino (daughter)
- Maria Pipino (daughter)
- Giovanni Pipino di Altamura (?-1357) (grandson)
- Pietro Pipino (grandson)
- Luigi (o Ludovico) Pipino (grandson)
- Matteo Pipino (grandson)

== Sources ==
- Domenico da Gravina (1349–1351). Chronicon de Rebus in Apulia Gestis.
- Giovanni Villani (1322–1348). Cronica (PDF). (In this book, Giovanni Pipino di Altamura is called il Paladino, while Giovanni Pipino da Barletta is called Gianni Pipino)
- Matteo Villani (1562). Historia di Matteo Villani cittadino fiorentino il quale continua l'historie di Giouan Villani suo fratello, nella quale oltre a i quattro primi libri già stampati, sono aggiunti altri cinque nuouamente ritrouati, & hora mandati in luce. Et comincia dall'anno 1348. Con due copiose tauole, l'una de' capitoli, l'altra delle cose. ad instanzia de' Giunti di Fiorenza.

== Bibliography ==
- Francesco Pinto (2013). Giovanni Pipino - Un barlettano alla corte di tre re (PDF). Barletta.
- Pino Gadaleta (1995). Giovanni Pipino, Palatino di Altamura, Conte di Minervino, Principe di Bari. Modugno: Edizioni dal Sud.

== See also ==
- Giovanni Pipino di Altamura
- Lucera
- Muslim settlement of Lucera
- Kingdom of Naples
