= Altamuran Revolution =

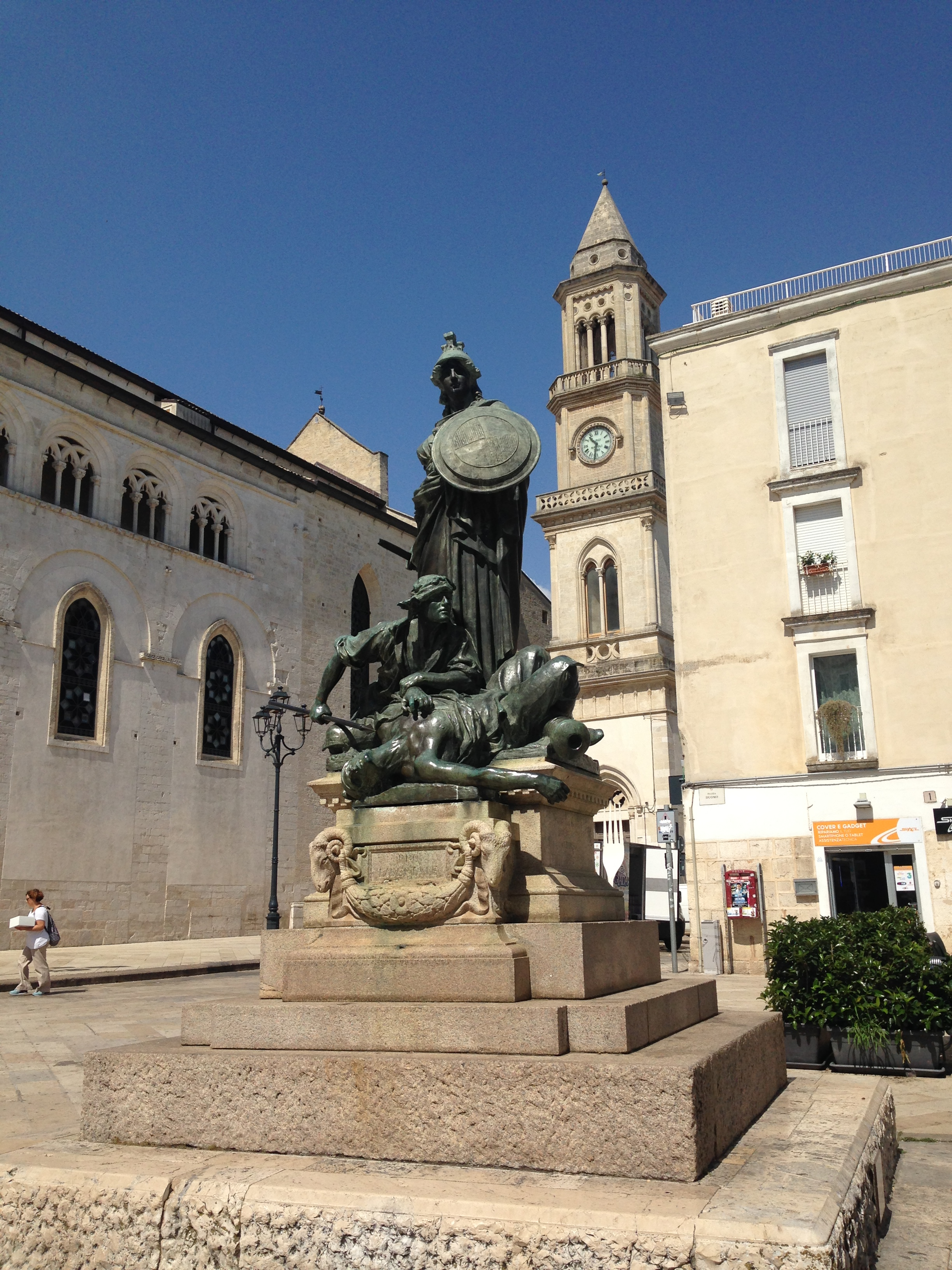
- Monument to the martyrs of the Altamuran Revolution (1799), by Arnaldo Zocchi, erected during the celebrations for the first centenary of the revolution (1899) and located in piazza Duomo (Altamura)
- Native name: Rivoluzione di Altamura
- Date: 8 February – 31 May 1799 (3 months, 3 weeks and 2 days)
- Location: Altamura, Parthenopean Republic
- Cause: Fall of the Parthenopean Republic and resistance to Sanfedisti
- Outcome: Defeat of the rebels and restoration of the Kingdom of Naples
- Deaths: at least 1400
- Arrests: about 200

The Altamuran Revolution (Italian: Rivoluzione di Altamura, also Rivoluzione altamurana) was a three-month period of self-government of the Italian town Altamura, right after the birth of the Parthenopean Republic (23 January 1799) which ousted the Bourbons and the Kingdom of Naples. The city of the Kingdom of Naples was then defeated and taken by the so-called Sanfedisti, led by cardinal Fabrizio Ruffo, after a battle on the city walls. After being defeated, most Altamurans managed to flee through Porta Bari, one of Altamura's main gates.

In February 1799, the news that the king had fled to Palermo arrived in Altamura. The Altamura population then reorganized and embraced the ideals propagated by the French Revolution. The Liberty Tree was also planted in what it was then called piazza del mercato (today called piazza Duomo). In the meantime, the Sanfedisti, led by the cardinal Fabrizio Ruffo, were getting closer and closer, determined to restore the Kingdom of Naples and the Bourbon dynasty. The Sanfedisti left Matera and arrived at the gates of Altamura on 9 May 1799. Altamura had already fixed everything before the battle, by closing the secondary city gates and preparing ammunition. On 9 May, the battle took place, but soon Altamurans ran out of ammunition and they started to shoot coins. This let the enemy realize that the situation inside the city was critical and that they wouldn't last for long. On the night of 9 May 1799, most Altamurans managed to escape from porta Bari. On the morning of 10 May, the Sanfedisti entered Altamura, sacking and slaughtering an unknown number of Altamurans who had remained there. The stay of the Sanfedisti and Ruffo inside the city lasted 14 days, during which the people living in Altamura gradually returned and some of them were killed or imprisoned. By the end of May 1799, the situation had already normalized and Altamura had returned under the full control of the Kingdom of Naples.

The number of deaths among the Sanfedisti has been estimated around 1,400 people, but it is not clear how many Altamurans were killed. Some historians estimated the losses among Altamurans from about forty to a hundred people, while other historians suggested that many Altamurans and Neapolitan Jacobin people coming to Altamura from other cities may have been counted as Sanfedisti. In this case the death toll among Altamurans and Parthenopean Republicans would have been considerably higher.

== Bibliography ==
- Antonio Lucarelli, Mario Proto (a cura di), La Puglia nella Rivoluzione napoletana del 1799, Manduria, 1998.
- Giuseppe Dambrosio, Altamura nel Settecento in Il 1799 – La Rivoluzione ad Altamura, Coordinamento Altamura Leonessa di Puglia, pp. 36–38.
- Giuseppe Pupillo, "La Repubblica Partenopea da Napoli ad Altamura – La controrivoluzione del Cardinale Ruffo e il sacco di Altamura", in ALTAMURA n. 40–41, 1999–2000.
- Giuseppe Bolognese (1999). Zecher la chorban - Memoria del sacrificio. Tipografia Castellano - Altamura.
- Domenico Sacchinelli (1836). Sulla vita del cardinale Fabrizio Ruffo (PDF). Tipografia di Carlo Calanco.
- Tommaso Fiore. Il sacco di Altamura (in Zecher la Chorban di Giuseppe Bolognese).
- Domenico Angelastri, Altamura e il Mezzogiorno nel 1799. Repertorio della Mostra e delle altre iniziative del Bicentenario, in “Altamura” – Rivista Storica/Bollettino dell'A.B.M.C. – 1999–2000, pp. 225 – 227
- Onofrio Bruno, "Assedio sanfedista comitati al lavoro", La Gazzetta del Mezzogiorno, 04/11/1998
- Ottavio Serena (1867). Alcuni fatti della rivoluzione del 1799 (lettera del 1862 ad Alexandre Dumas padre). Napoli: Tipografia del Giornale di Napoli (strada Forno vecchio, 2).
- Ottavio Serena (1993). Giuseppe Pupillo (ed.). Altamura nel 1799. Cassano Murge.
- Ottavio Serena (1899). Altamura nel 1799. Roma.
- Ottavio Serena (1899). Altamura nel 1799. Documenti e cronache inedite. Altamura: Tipografia Portoghese.
- Ottavio Serena (1887). Di un'antica Università di Studi nelle Puglie. Roma.
- Pia Maria Digiorgio, "Esiste un centenario della Repubblica napoletana in provincia? L'esempio del 1899" in Basilicata in A. De Francesco (a cura di), La democrazia alla prova della spada. Esperienza e memoria del 1799 in Europa, Guerini, Abbiategrasso 2003 pp. 503–525.
- Vincenzo Vicenti, "La crisi demaniale di Altamura dal 1542 al 1562", in ALTAMURA n. 14, 1972.
- Vincenzo Vicenti (1998). Arcangela Vicenti e Giuseppe Pupillo (ed.). Medaglioni altamurani del 1799. Cassano Murge.
- A.A. V.V., Dal primo Settecento all'Unità, in Storia d'Italia, Torino 1978, vol. III.
- Michele Ferri (2001). Il brigante Chiavone. Sora: Azienda di Promozione Turistica di Frosinone, Centro sorano di ricerca culturale.

== See also ==
- Porta Bari
- Altamura
- Parthenopean Republic
- Luca de Samuele Cagnazzi
- Kingdom of Naples
