= Giovanni Pipino di Altamura =

- Coat of arms
- Died: 1357; Altamura, Kingdom of Naples
- Noble family: Pipino family

Giovanni Pipino di Altamura (Giovanni Pipino II or just Giovanni Pipino, Latin: Iohannes Pipinus) (died 1357 in Altamura) was an Italian nobleman and condottiero. He belonged to the Pipino noble family, which began with Giovanni Pipino da Barletta (died 1316 in Naples) and that, after just a few decades, declined.

He was the count of Minervino Murge and Altamura, as well as the grandson of Giovanni Pipino da Barletta. Together with his brothers, he was well known for his violent character and arrogance towards the people he ruled over. According to sources, the brothers tried to subjugate many cities and territories of the Kingdom of Naples over the first half of the XIV century, taking advantage of the disorder and absence of power in the Kingdom of Naples which started right before the death of Robert of Anjou, king of Naples. Giovanni and his brothers did not comply with Robert's orders and, because of this and their arrogance, they were imprisoned. They managed to leave prison only after the king's death. They often changed sides: first, they fought for Andrew of Hungary, and then for Joanna I of Naples and her husband Louis, Prince of Taranto. Eventually, they backed Louis of Durazzo.

Because of his character and his disloyalty to the king, Giovanni Pipino di Altamura was captured in 1357 in Matera Castle and then he was brought to the nearby city of Altamura, where he was hanged from the battlements of Altamura Castle. According to the book Vita di Cola di Rienzo (written by an anonymous author), he had to wear a paper crown because he called himself "king of Apulia". His corpse was then dismembered in four partsby means of four horses, which were then displayed in areas of the city of Altamura as a warning to the subjects. One of his legs was displayed on the right of Porta Matera (one of the main gates of the City Walls of Altamura). The leg was then replaced by a bas-relief depicting Pipino's coat of arms and his leg. The bas-relief was destroyed and rebuilt in 1648 because of the restoration of the city walls; it is still visible on the right side of Porta Matera.

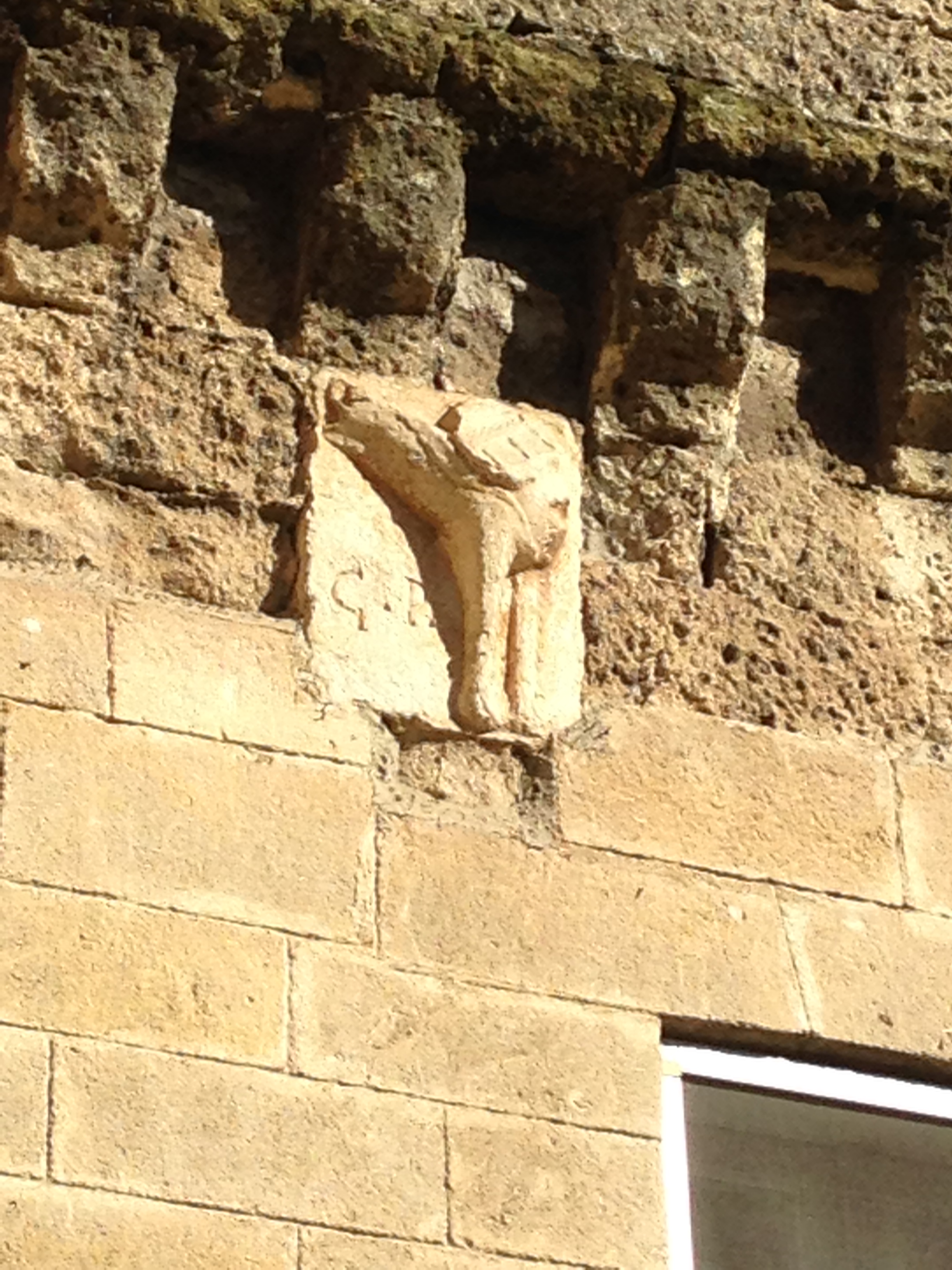
Bas-relief depicting "Pipino's leg", located close to Porta Matera (Altamura)

Shortly thereafter, his brother Luigi Pipino was also captured and hanged on the battlements of the castle of Minervino Murge; while the last brother Pietro Pipino went into a self-imposed exile in Rome, losing all the property of his family and ending the Pipino dynasty.

== Coat of arms ==
The coat of arms of the Pipino family is shown in the tomb of Giovanni Pipino da Barletta (located in the church of San Pietro a Majella, Naples) and it is made of a gray background, and a light blue transverse band containing three golden shells.

The coat of arms can also be seen inside the castle of Minervino Murge, but it's been partly damaged, presumably by his and his brothers' enemies.

== Family ==
- Nicola Pipino (great-grandfather)
- Giovanni Pipino da Barletta (died 1316) (grandfather)
- Nicola Pipino (uncle)
- Niccolò Pipino (father)
- Giovannella di Altamura (mother) - daughter of Giovanni di Sparano di Bari
- Angiola Pipino (aunt)
- Margherita Pipino (aunt)
- Maria Pipino (aunt)
- Pietro Pipino (brother)
- Luigi (o Ludovico) Pipino (brother)
- Matteo Pipino (brother)

== Sources ==
- Anonimo (1828). Vita di Cola di Rienzo: tribuno del popolo romano. pp. 193–197.
- Domenico da Gravina (1349–1351). Chronicon de Rebus in Apulia Gestis.
- Giovanni Villani (1322–1348). Cronica (PDF). (In this book, Giovanni Pipino di Altamura is called "il Paladino", while his grandfather is called "Gianni Pipino")
- Matteo Villani (1562). Historia di Matteo Villani cittadino fiorentino il quale continua l'historie di Giouan Villani suo fratello, nella quale oltre a i quattro primi libri già stampati, sono aggiunti altri cinque nuouamente ritrouati, & hora mandati in luce. Et comincia dall'anno 1348. Con due copiose tauole, l'una de' capitoli, l'altra delle cose. ad instanzia de' Giunti di Fiorenza.

== Bibliography ==
- Francesco Pinto (2013). Giovanni Pipino - Un barlettano alla corte di tre re (PDF). Barletta.
