= Megalithic Walls of Altamura =

- Mura megalitiche di Altamura (Italian)
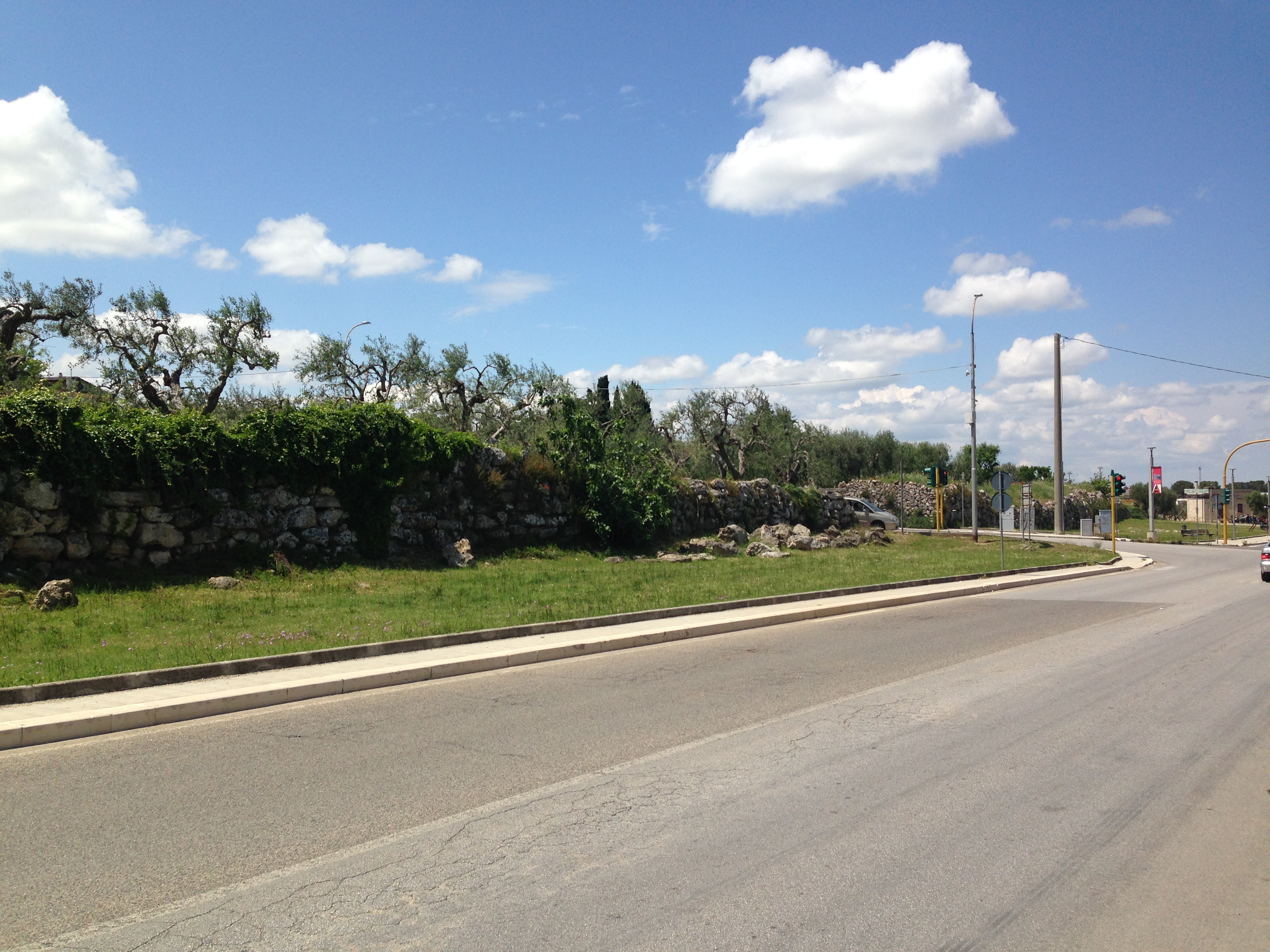
- View from via Cassano (Altamura, Italy)
- Interactive map of Megalithic Walls of Altamura
- 40.831116°N 16.563098°E
- Nearest city: Altamura

History
- Original use: Defensive wall of the ancient city (before the Middle Ages)

Site notes
- Height: about 5 meters

The Megalithic Walls of Altamura (Italian: Mura megalitiche di Altamura) are defensive walls dating back to the 4th century BCE. They were the city walls of the ancient city of Altamura, Italy. Nowadays, only a few parts of the original wall remain; the original track of the wall spanned over a length of about 3.6 km. They were about 4 meters high, while the base of the walls was about 5 meters wide.

The megalithic walls are often confused with the city walls of today's Altamura historic center, of which fragments remain today in some parts as well. The two walls refer to different time periods and to different parts of the city: the megalithic walls refer to the ancient city, which was later abandoned or sacked, while the walls of Altamura historic center refer to the period starting from the founding of Altamura by king Frederick II of Hohenstaufen (13th century AD).

== Cesare Orlandi ==
Cesare Orlandi, in his work Delle città d'Italia (1770), mentioned the wall and suggested that the name of the city of Altamura might be due to its megalithic walls. He also mentioned a large number of archaeological findings of that period, which occurred very close the megalithic walls and that now have been lost.

According to the common opinion, Altamura was said to be placed on top of highest part of an ancient wall, which still exists, and it is believed to be older than the time the city was refounded by the emperor Frederick II. This ancient wall, made of large square stones, is about three miles long; starting from the top and spreading along the base of the hill, facing towards the North. Up to the present time, such a wall preserves the ancient remains of three of its gates, and it embraces some small roads, and landed wells. Along the foot outside this wall, and in its vicinity, ancient sepulchres, with human bones, of both precious and low-metal medals, Greek and Roman, are found from time to time under the ground; household tools, perpetual lamps, with asbestos wicks: basins, lacrimal urns [..]. From similar findings, it is inferred that such an old wall belonged to a sacked city.

— Cesare Orlandi, Delle città d'Italia (1790), p. 399

== Rocca maps ==
Inside Rocca map P/33, commissioned by Angelo Rocca and stored inside Angelica Library, Rome, some memorial stones can be seen on the megalithic walls. At the end of the 16th century, those memorial stones were still present, before being destroyed at a certain point.

== Gallery ==
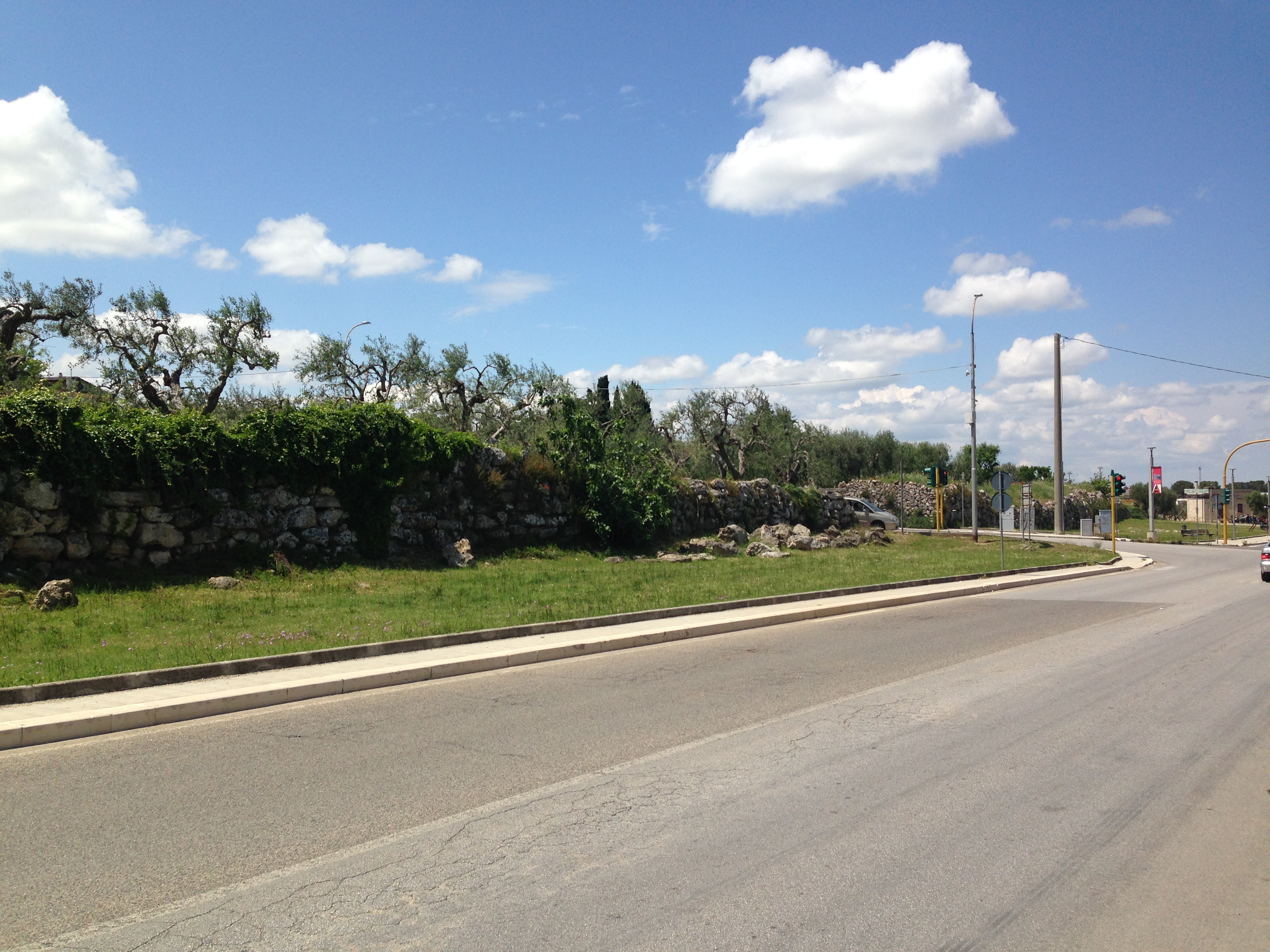
Megalithic walls of Altamura - Via Cassano

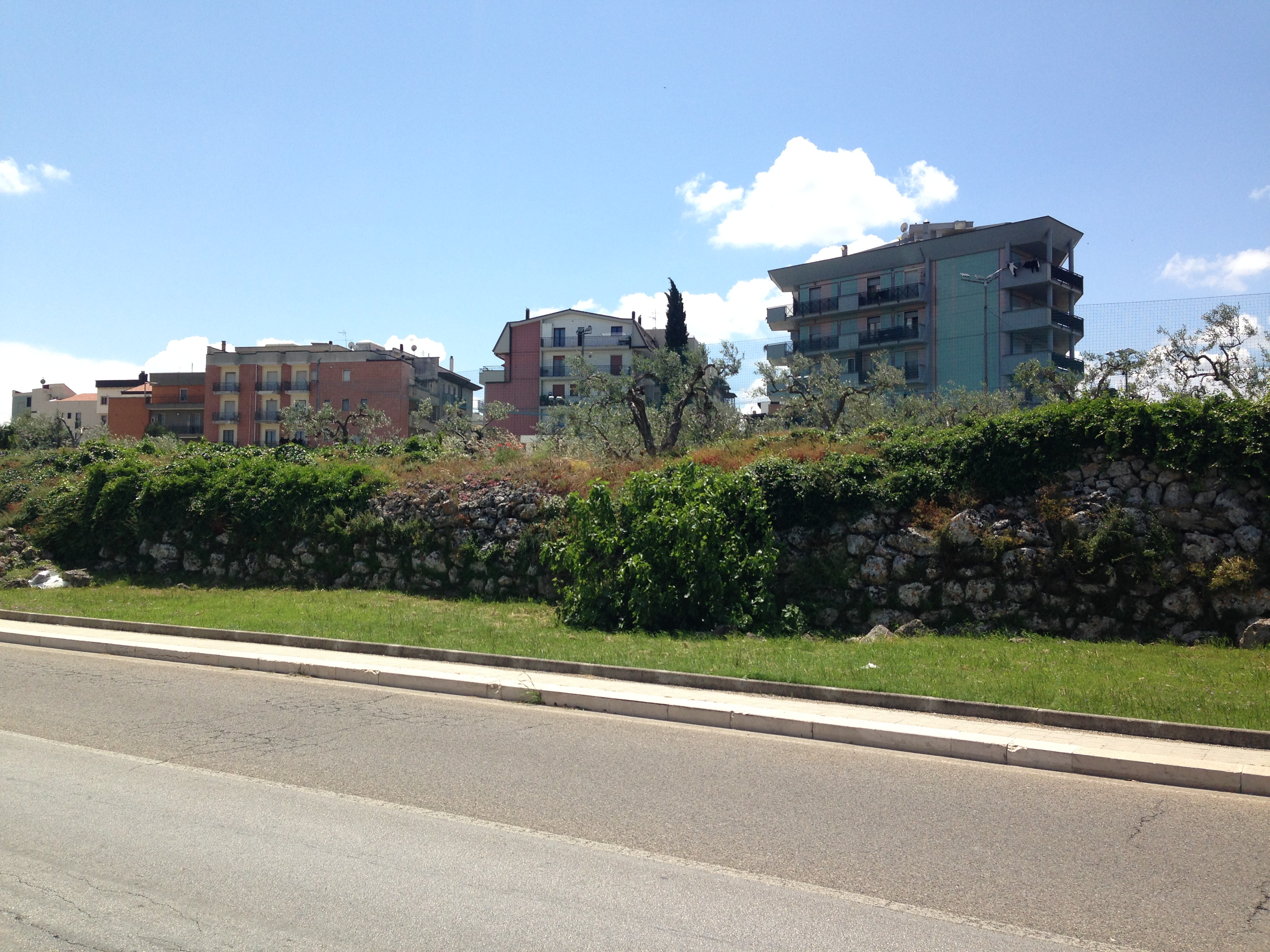
Megalithic walls of Altamura - Part between via Cassano and via Santeramo

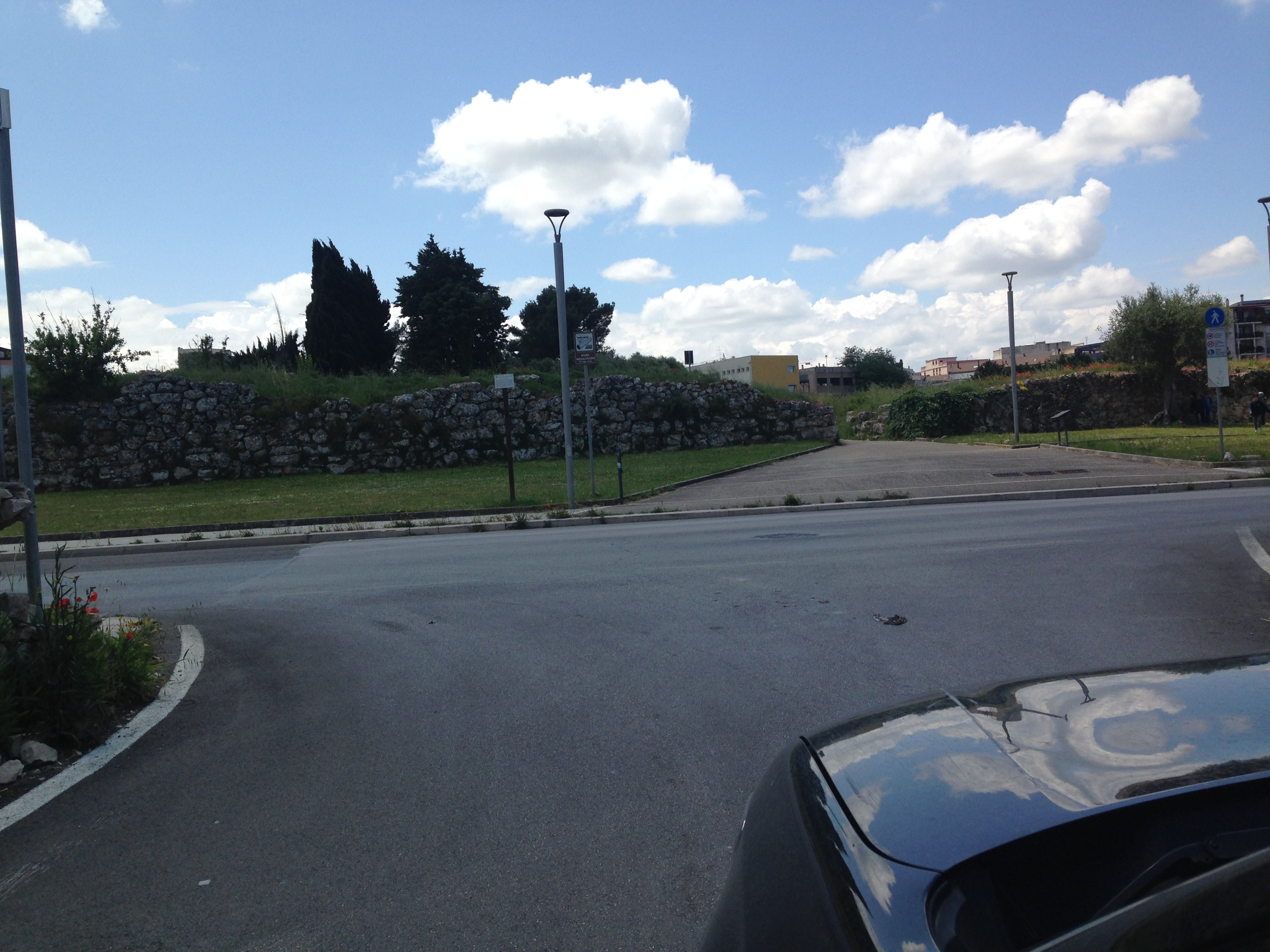
The only gate (called "Porta Alba") that survived of the megalithic walls - Part between via Cassano and via Bari

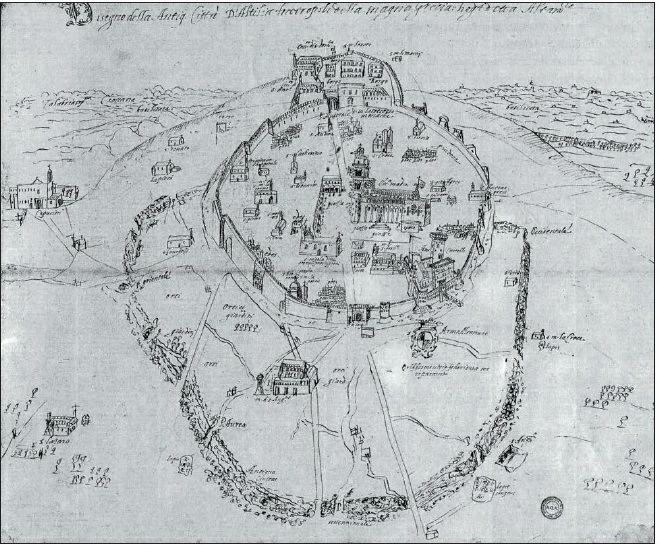
Megalithic walls of Altamura in 1584 (external walls) and the defensive wall of the new city of Altamura (Archivio Generalizio Agostiniano - Carte Rocca P33, stored in Biblioteca Angelica, Rome)

== See also ==
- Altamura Man
- Epitaph of Altamura
- City Walls of Altamura
- Altamura Cathedral
