= Domenico Sacchinelli =

Abbot of the Catholic church (b.1766 d.1844)

- Born: 18 May 1766; Pizzoni, Kingdom of Naples
- Died: 6 July 1844; Monteleone, now called Vibo Valentia, Kingdom of the Two Sicilies
- Occupation: Abbot of the Catholic Church

Domenico Sacchinelli (18 April 1766 – 6 July 1844) was an abbot of the Catholic Church. He is best known for having followed and helped Fabrizio Ruffo and the Sanfedisti army to restore the Kingdom of Naples and the Bourbon dynasty, after the short-lived Parthenopean Republic (1799). In 1836, after a few decades, he published his memoirs of that period, titled Memorie storiche sulla vita del cardinale Fabrizio Ruffo.

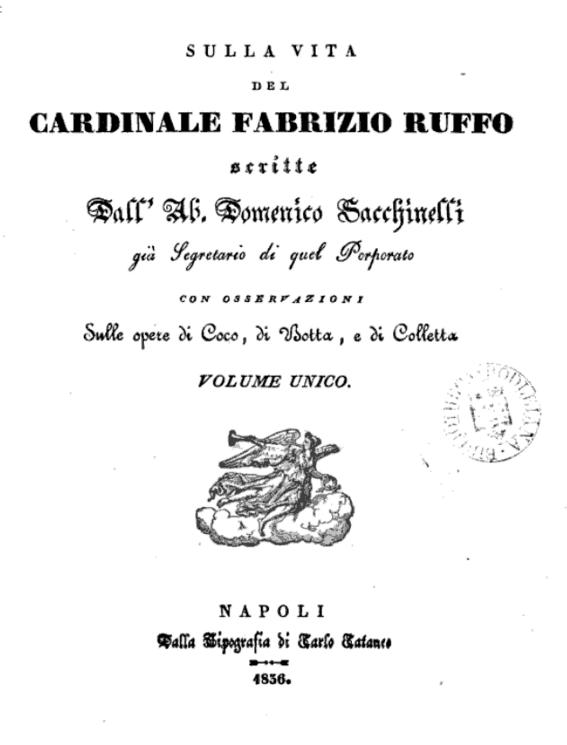
The first page of the memoirs written by abbot Domenico Sacchinelli

== Life ==
Domenico Sacchinelli was born in Pizzoni, Calabria (Italy), from Francesco Sacchinelli and Serafina Conciatore, who decided to give him a good education; they also wanted him to become a monk. Nonetheless, when he was just 18 years old, he decided to leave his hometown in order to get a job as a scribe in the city of Catanzaro, inside the Cassa sacra; this was an institution founded by king Ferdinand I of the Two Sicilies to recover from the earthquake occurred in 1783. In this new position, thanks to the rigid education he had been given, he proved to be highly skilled and professional in his job, and because of this he was highly respected by his superior, the auditor and government inspector Carlo Pedicini, who wanted Sacchinelli to work for him in his new seat in Monteleone. There he could continue his education and in 1794 he was ordained as priest, thus becoming the priest in the diocese of Mileto.

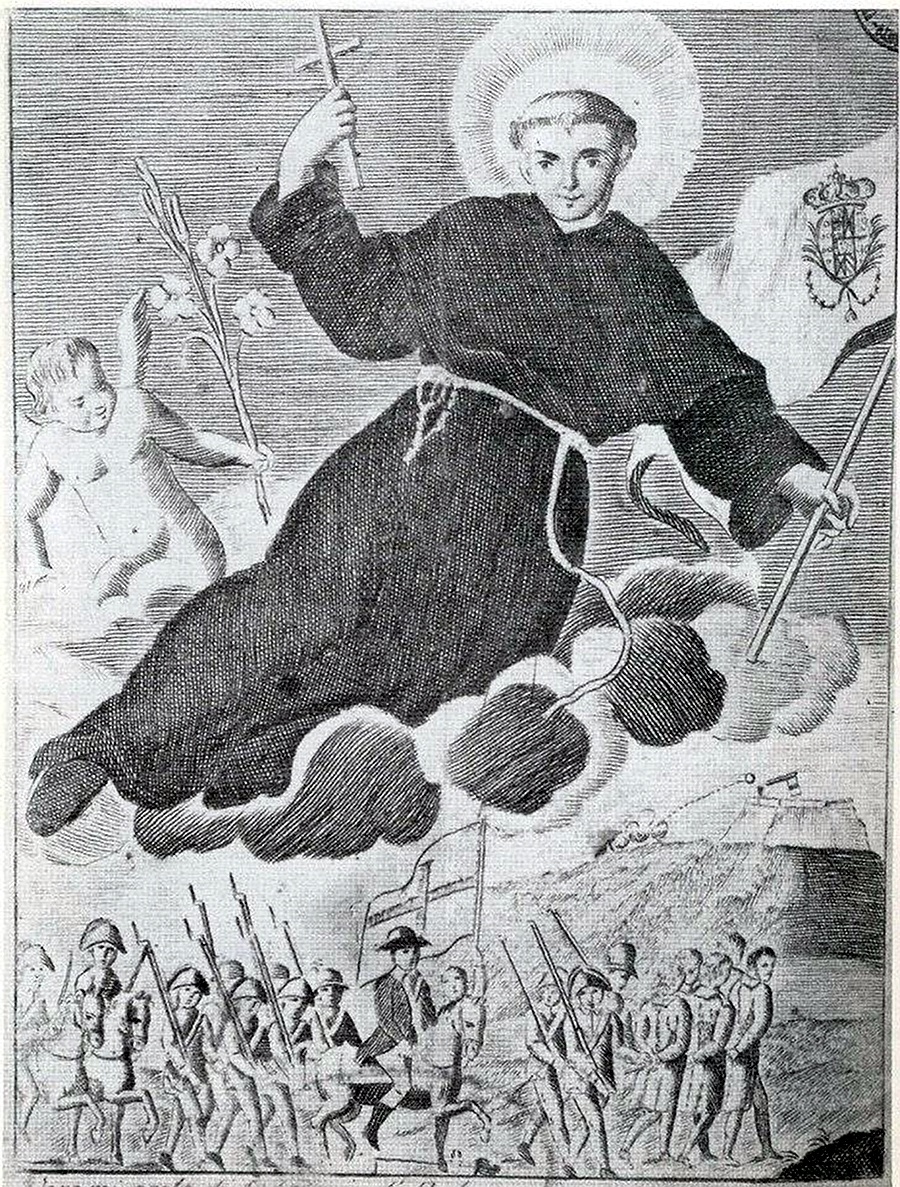
The Sanfedisti Army in 1799, led by Cardinal Fabrizio Ruffo and protected by Saint Anthony

The activities carried out inside the diocese and his intellectual skills (reported by his superiors) managed to bring him closer to Cardinal Fabrizio Ruffo, who was then in Calabria, busy in recruiting militias, which would form the Christian Royal Army, (Italian: Armata Cristiana e Reale, later known as Army of Holy Faith Italian: Esercito della Santa Fede). Ruffo wanted him to join the espedition, hiring him as undersecretary (Italian: sotto segretario alla Segreteria dell'Armata), with a wage of twenty ducats per month

This episode was crucial in Sacchinelli's life, who switched from being a humble priest in a small town to being involved in battles which led to the fall of the Parthenopean Republic (1799) and to the Restoration of the Bourbon kings. In this period, he was close to Cardinal Ruffo, sharing all the most delicate moments and decision; later in his life, he wrote a memoir on Ruffo's life.

After the restoration, he continued to collaborate with Ruffo, travelling between Rome, Naples, Palermo and Paris and following, as a secretary, Ruffo's affairs. In this period, he was also promoted abbot, but the exact date is unknown. He's also remembered in history as an abbot, but he probably didn't belong to any religious order, and he may instead have been a "secular abbot".

In August 1823, he had the privilege to join the Conclave, where new Pope Leo XII was elected, following also in this situation the Cardinal Ruffo, who wanted Sacchinelli to accompany him as a conclavist.

After this last period in Naples, he eventually returned to his hometown Pizzoni after having been away from home for so long (except some short periods). He bought from the Cassa sacra, the ruins of what once was the ancient convent of San Basilio and the nearby church names Chiesa del soccorso. On the area of the convent, he built a small building, for himself and his relatives, while the reconstruction of the church, later called "Vergine Santissima del Rosario", was attended by his two nieces Fortunata and Rosa, both of them sisters and daughters of Sacchinelli's brother Nicola.

He eventually left Pizzoni, in order to spend the last part of his life in Monteleone, where, as proposed by Giuseppa Ruffo of the princes of Scilla, wife of senator Enrico Gagliardi, was hired by don Francesco Gagliardi marquis of Panaya as his advisor, confirming the high esteem and trust gained by Sacchinelli among the most prominent members ruling class of the time.

== Works by Domenico Sacchinelli ==
- Domenico Sacchinelli (1836). Memorie storiche sulla vita del cardinale Fabrizio Ruffo, con osservazioni sulle opere di Cuoco, Colletta e Botta (PDF). Tipografia di Carlo Calanco.
- Domenico Sacchinelli (1838). Risposte dell'Ab.e Domenico Sacchinelli alle osservazioni sulle Memorie storiche della vita del cardinale Fabrizio Ruffo per l'impresa guerriera del 1799. Tipografia di Carlo Cataneo.

== Bibliography ==
- Memorie storiche sulla vita del Cardinale Fabrizio Ruffo, con osservazioni sulle opere di Coco, di Botta e di Colletta. Second Edition, Tip. Poliglotta, Roma 1895 (1st ed.: Cattaneo, Napoli 1836).
- Maresca, Giovanni (1883). "Carteggio del Cardinale Fabrizio Ruffo, con Lord Acton e la regina Maria Carolina". Archivio storico per le province napoletane. VIII (II).
- Filia, Francesco (1907). Breve monografia storico-critica sull'Abate Domenico Sacchinelli, segretario e biografo del cardinale Fabrizio Ruffo. Napoli: Tip. Lanciano e Veraldi.
- Casaburi, Mario (2003). Fabrizio Ruffo: l'uomo, il cardinale, il condottiero, l'economista, il politico. Soveria Mannelli: Rubbettino Editore. ISBN 8849805810.
- Acton, Harold (1997). I Borboni di Napoli: 1734-1825. Florence: Giunti Editori. ISBN 978-88-0921-079-0.
- Giovanni Pititto - Archivio Storico della Calabria - Nuova Serie - Anno I. Numero 1. Luigi Pellegrini Editore. Cosenza - 2013
- Serena, Ottavio (1867). Alcuni fatti della rivoluzione del 1799 (lettera del 1862 ad Alexandre Dumas padre). Naples: Tipografia del Giornale di Napoli (strada Forno vecchio, 2).
- Sanguinetti, Oscar (1999). "Altamura. La strage delle Innocenti. Un falso storico contro l'insorgenza italiana". Cristianità. XXVII (287–288).
- Giuseppe Bolognese (1999). Zecher la chorban - Memoria del sacrificio. Tipografia Castellano - Altamura.

== See also ==
- Fabrizio Ruffo
