= Domenico Santoro =

Italian local historian

- Died: after 1688
- Occupations: physician, historian
- Known for: a short essay on the history of the city of Altamura, Italy

Domenico Santoro (died after 1688) was a local historian and physician closely related to the city of Altamura, Kingdom of Naples. He's known mostly for his essay on the history of the that town: "Description of the city of Altamura" (Italian: Descrizione della città di Altamura, 1688).

In his work, the author provides information on the history and the life of Altamura, perhaps drawing from documents now lost. The work has also been copied by priest D. Vitangelo Frizzale. One limit of his work is the absence of critical analysis of the sources, and the commingling of history and legend, as Ottavio Serena later pointed out.

== Life ==
There is very little on his life. Local historian Tommaso Berloco claimed that he may have been a jurist and that he belonged to a noble family living in Altamura, which originated in Caserta. According to more recent research, it was a physician (then called dottor fisico). His only work - Descrizione della città di Altamura (1688) - provided plenty of information about the history of the city of Altamura. A street in Altamura has been named after him.

Cesare Orlandi, in his work Delle Città d'Italia (1770) mentions Giovanni Donato, which was also a jurist from Altamura and he was more famous than him. Local historian Tommaso Berloco suggested that Orlandi mentioned Donato in order to thank him for the source, and he suggested that Giovanni Donato may have used pseudonym "Domenico Santoro". Another hypothesis is that Giovanni Donato was a relative of Domenico Santoro's.

The original edition of his work, as well as the following, went lost. The manuscript which survived dates back to the 19th century or the early years of the 20th century. Even though the manuscript is a faithful reproduction of his original work, it contains a few copying mistakes and parts added by other writers.

=== Works ===
- Santoro, Domenico (1688). Descrizione della città di Altamura.

== Bibliography ==
- Berloco, Tommaso (1985). Storie inedite della città di Altamura. ATA - Associazione Turistica Altamurana Pro Loco.

== See also ==
- Altamura
