= Archdiocese of Potenza-Muro Lucano-Marsico Nuovo =

Roman Catholic archdiocese in Italy

Coordinates: 40.6333°N 15.8000°E

Archdiocese of Potenza-Muro Lucano-Marsico Nuovo Archidioecesis Potentina-Murana-Marsicensis

Catholic
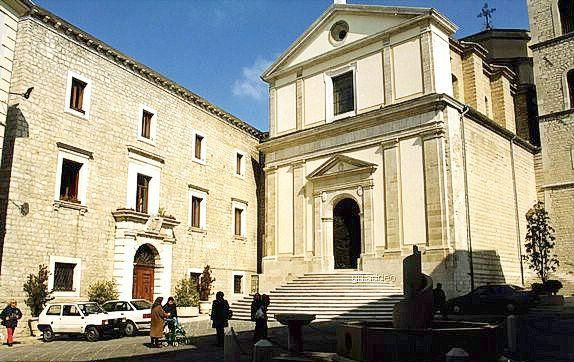
- Potenza Cathedral

Location
- Country: Italy
- Ecclesiastical province: Potenza-Muro Lucano-Marsico Nuovo

Statistics
- Area: 1,634 km^{2} (631 sq mi)
- Population: Total; Catholics: (as of 2023); 155,500 (est.) ▼; 153,000 (est.) ▼
- Parishes: 61 ▲

Information
- Denomination: Catholic Church
- Rite: Roman Rite
- Established: 5th century
- Cathedral: Basilica Cattedrale di S. Maria Assunta e S. Gerardo Vescovo (Potenza)
- Co-cathedral: Concattedrale di S. Maria Assunta o S. Giorgio (Marsico Nuovo); Concattedrale di S. Nicola (Muro Lucano)
- Secular priests: 76 (diocesan) ▼27 (religious orders) ▼17 Permanent Deacons ▼

Current leadership
- Pope: Leo XIV
- Archbishop: Davide Carbonaro
- Bishops emeritus: Salvatore Ligorio

Map
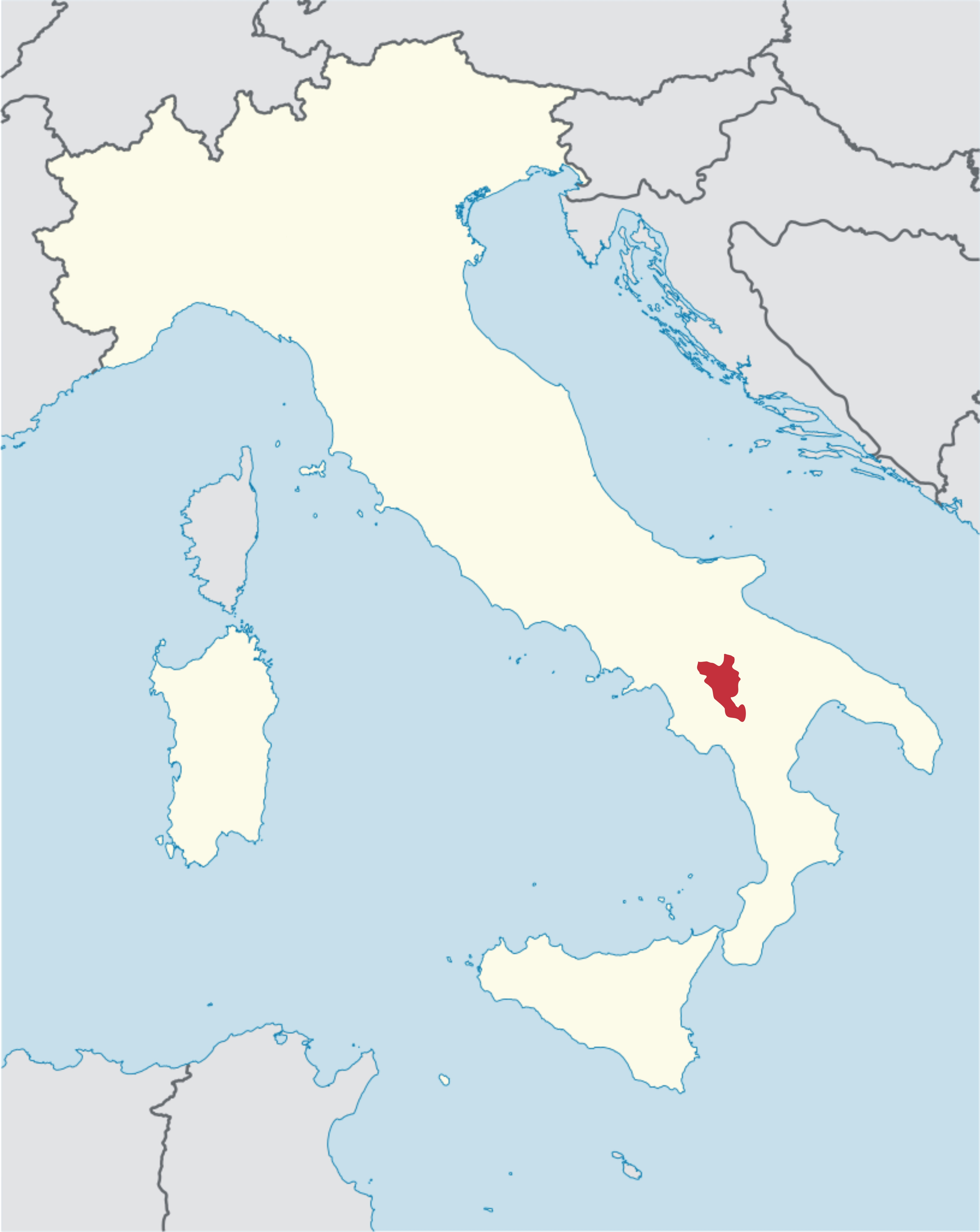

Website
- Archdiocese web site (in Italian)

The Archdiocese of Potenza-Muro Lucano-Marsico Nuovo (Latin: Archidioecesis Potentina-Murana-Marsicensis) is a Latin diocese of the Catholic Church in Basilicata, southern Italy.

The current archdiocese is the result of two mergers. The historical Diocese of Potenza was united with the Diocese of Marsico Nuovo in 1818 to form the Archdiocese of Potenza e Marsico Nuovo, which was elevated to an archdiocese in 1973 and made a metropolitan see in 1976. In 1986, the Diocese of Muro Lucano was merged into it to form the current archdiocese.

The Ecclesiastical Province of Potenza (Basilicata) is composed of Potenza and its five suffragan dioceses: the Archdiocese of Acerenza, the Archdiocese of Matera-Irsina, the Diocese of Melfi-Rapolla-Venosa, the Diocese of Tricarico, and the Diocese of Tursi-Lagonegro.

== History ==
The town claims that it was evangelized by Saint Peter; Saint Aruntius and his companions are said to have suffered martyrdom there under the Emperor Maximian. The legend has been destructively criticized by Francesco Lanzoni (1927).

The date of the establishment of the Diocese of Potenza (Potentinus) is not known. The earliest known bishop is Herculentius, who corresponded with Pope Gelasius I between 494 and 496.

An outstanding bishop was Gerardo della Porta (1099–1119), who was recognized as a saint, and to whom the cathedral is dedicated, along with the universal dedication to the Assumption throughout the kingdom of Naples. In 1221, Bishop Garsias limited the number of canons in the cathedral Chapter to twelve. In 1721, the Chapter was headed by three dignities (the Archdeacon, the Archpriest, and the Cantor) and nine canons.

The town of Potenza was destroyed by the earthquake of 1273 (or 1278).

Potenza was destroyed by order of the Emperor Frederick II, and was rebuilt by Bishop Oberto, beginning in 1250, to be destroyed again under Charles of Anjou.

The Cathedral, built by Bishop Oberto (attested 1250–1256), was restored by Giovanni Andrea Serra (1783–99), and Achille Caracciolo (1616). Bishop Achille Caracciolo was also responsible for laying the cornerstone of a new seminary.

In 1694, Potenza was involved in the earthquake of 8 September, which affected nearly the entire kingdom of Naples. Three hundred houses were completely destroyed, the rest suffered damage. The church of Santissima Trinità and the castello were heavily damaged. Four or five people were reported dead. The seminary building also suffered severe damage. Bishop Agnello Rossi (1695–1707) began the reconstruction.

Bishop Giovanni Andrea Serrao (1783–1799) of Potenza was assassinated on 24 February 1799. He had been the Jansenist leader in southern Italy, and was an Erastian in church politics. He supported the French inspired Parthenopean Republic, and was a target of Cardinal Fabrizio Ruffo's sanfedist army.

On 27 June 1818, the diocese of Potenza was united with Diocese of Marsico Nuovo to form Diocese of Potenza e Marsico Nuovo. Potenza was made a suffragan of the archdiocese of Acerenza, along with Anglona e Tursi, Tricarico, and Venosa. The diocese of Matera was suppressed and united with the archdiocese of Acerenza.

In the earthquake of 1 February 1826, all of the public and private buildings were seriously damaged. Two or three old buildings collapsed completely. The palace of the royal Intendant, the episcopal palace, the monastery of the Riformati, and the civic hospital were reduced to a bad condition. The campanile of the cathedral lost its lead roof. In the earthquake of 16 December 1857, in Basilicata there were 9591 deaths, with 1411 reported wounded. In the city of Potenza alone, 22 died and 11 were injured. Aftershocks continued into the next year. According to Cappelletti, the city of Potenza was practically annihilated.

A diocesan synod was held in Potenza by Bishop Gaspare Cardoso, O.S.B. (1606 – 1615) on 2 April 1606. Bishop Pietro Ignazio Marolda held a diocesan synod in Potenza in 1834.

=== Post-Vatican II changes ===
On 11 February 1973, Pope Paul VI promoted the diocese of Potenza e Marsico Nuovo to the status of an archdiocese, and made it immediately subject to the papacy; it had been suffragan to the Archdiocese of Acerenza. The bishop was given the rank of archbishop, and granted the right to use the processional cross and the pallium. The College of Canons of the cathedral, as well, were given archdiocesan dignity and privileges.

On 31 May 1973, by decree of the Congregation of Bishops of the papal curia, five parishes belonging to the Diocese of Campagna were transferred to the jurisdiction of the archdiocese of Potenza. In 1986, the diocese of Campagna was completely suppressed.

On 8 September 1976, the Congregations transferred territory from the Diocese of Acerenza, the Diocese of Rapolla, and from the Territorial Abbacy of Santissima Trinità di Cava de’ Tirreni It also lost two towns to the diocese of Anglona-Tursi.

Following the Second Vatican Council, and in accordance with the norms laid out in the council's decree, Christus Dominus chapter 40, Pope Paul VI ordered a reorganization of the ecclesiastical provinces in southern Italy. The decree Eo quod spirituales of 12 September 1976 created a new episcopal conference in the region called "Basilicata", to which were assigned all of the dioceses that belonged to the ecclesiastical province of Potenza, including Materana and Mons Pelusii; they had formerly belonged to the episcopal conference of "Apulia". Pope Paul VI ordered consultations among the members of the Congregation of Bishops in the Vatican Curia, the Italian Bishops Conference, and the various dioceses concerned. After twenty years, problems and objections were still apparent.

On 18 February 1984, the Vatican and the Italian State signed a new and revised concordat. Based on the revisions, a set of Normae was issued on 15 November 1984, which was accompanied in the next year, on 3 June 1985, by enabling legislation. According to the agreement, the practice of having one bishop govern two separate dioceses at the same time, aeque personaliter, was abolished. The Vatican continued consultations which had begun under Pope John XXIII for the merging of small dioceses, especially those with personnel and financial problems, into one combined diocese.

On 30 September 1986, Pope John Paul II ordered that the dioceses of Potenza, Marsico Nuovo, and Muro Lucano be merged into one diocese with one bishop, with the Latin title Archidioecesis Potentina-Murana-Marsicensis. The seat of the diocese was to be in Potenza, and the cathedral of Potenza was to serve as the cathedral of the merged diocese. The cathedrals in Marsico Nuovo and Muro Lucano were to become co-cathedrals, and their cathedral Chapters were each to be a Capitulum Concathedralis. There was to be only one diocesan Tribunal, in Potenza, and likewise one seminary, one College of Consultors, and one Priests' Council. The territory of the new diocese was to include the territory of the suppressed dioceses of Marsico Nuovo and Muro Lucano.

On 25 January 1998 the archdiocese of Potenza gained territory from the Archdiocese of Sant’Angelo dei Lombardi–Conza–Nusco–Bisaccia.

The cathedral Chapter of Potenza is currently (2022) composed of thirteen persons: ten canons (including a president, a vice-president, an economus, and a penitentiary) and three honorary canons. The president also serves as the parish priest of the cathedral parish.

In 1990, the six bishops of the ecclesiastical province of Basilicata established a joint seminary for the training of priests, situated in Potenza. The seminary of Potenza was closed, and its building was repurposed as the Osthello della Gioventù.

== Bishops and Archbishops ==
=== Diocese of Potenza ===
Metropolitan: Archdiocese of Acerenza e Matera

==== to 1350 ====
...

- Herculentius (attested 494–498)

?Amandus (c. 500-502)
...

- Petrus (attested early 559)

...
?Bala(s) (826)
...

- Bruno (1068)

...

- Gerardus (attested 1099–1111)
- Manfredus (attested c. 1123/1124)

...

- Joannes (attested 1177–1179)

...

- Bartholomaeus (attested 1197–1200)
- Henricus (attested 1206)

...

- Garsias (attested 1218–1221)
- Eleachinus (attested 1223)
- Thomasinus, O.Praem. (attested 1231)

...

- Obertus (attested 1250–1256)
- Gualterius de Calabria, O.P. (attested 1267-1279)
- Bonifatius
- Franciscus (attested 1290)
- Guilelmus (d. 1343)
- Guilelmus de la Torre de Adria, O.Min. (1343–1351)

==== 1350 to 1650 ====
- Giovanni de Rupella, O.Carm. (1351–1364)
- Jacobus (1364–1374)
- Bartolomeo della Spina (1374– )

...

- Marcus (attested 1386)
- Andreas (1389–1392) Roman Obedience
- Niccolò de Vincioni (11 Nov 1392 – 21 May 1395)

...

- Jacobus Roman Obedience
- Benedictus de Arpino, O.Min. (1399–1402) Roman Obedience
- Andreas Sinrao (1402–1404) Roman Obedience
- Benedictus de Arpino, O.Min. (1404–1419)
- Angelo (11 Sep 1419 – 1429)
- Giacomo Squacquera (1429–1450)
- Antonio Angeli (1450–1462)
- Giovanni Paolo Vassalli (1463–1468)
- Luigi Caracciolo (1469–1482)
- Giovanni Filippo Castiglioni (1482–1490)
- Juan Ortega (1502–1503)

Jaime Serra i Cau (29 Nov 1503 – 7 Aug 1506 Resigned) Administrator

- Giacomo Nini (7 Aug 1506 – 1521 Resigned)

Pompeo Colonna (7 Jan 1521 – 21 Nov 1526 Deprived) Administrator

- Nino Nini (28 Nov 1526 – 21 Jan 1564)
- Tiberio Carafa (15 May 1566 – 1579)
- Sebastiano Barnaba (17 Aug 1579 – 19 Jun 1606 Died)

Antonio Vespoli, Theat. (1599–1600?) Coadjutor

- Gaspare Cardoso, O.S.B. ([7 April 1603] – 19 Jun 1606 – 1615 Died)
- Achille Caracciolo (2 May 1616 – 1623 Died)

Sede Vacante (1623–1626)

- Diego Vargas (20 Jul 1626 – Oct 1633 Died)
- Girolamo Magnesi (20 Nov 1634 – 1644 Died)
- Miguel de Torres, O.P. (18 Apr 1644 – 1645 Died)

==== from 1650 to 1819 ====
- Bonaventura Claverio, O.F.M. Conv. (16 Jul 1646 – 1671)
- Diego Lozano González, O. Carm. (13 Sep 1677 – 10 Sep 1681)
- Luigi de Filippi, O.P. (3 Jul 1684 – 5 Jan 1685)
- Baldassare de Benavente, O. de M. (13 May 1686 – 30 Oct 1687)
- Pietro de Torres (24 Jan 1689 – 24 Jan 1695 Confirmed, Archbishop of Trani)
- Agnello Rossi, O. Carm. (2 May 1695 – 30 Apr 1707 Died)
- Carlo Pignatelli, C.R. (23 Sep 1715 – 14 Jan 1722 Appointed, Bishop of Gaeta)
- Biagio de Dura (2 Mar 1722 – Mar 1740 Died)
- José Alfonso Meléndez, O.F.M. Disc. (30 Jan 1741 – 1748)
- Tommaso Ignatius Antonio Sersale, C.R. (1 Apr 1748 – 18 Jul 1749)
- Bonaventura Fabozzi, O.F.M. (21 Jul 1749 – 4 Jan 1761)
- Carlo Parlati, C.P.O. (6 Apr 1761 – 1767)
- Domenico Russo (16 May 1768 – 1780)
- Giovanni Andrea Serrao (18 Jul 1783 – 24 Feb 1799 Died)
- Bartolomeo de Cesare (26 Jun 1805 – 30 Sep 1819 Died)

=== Diocese of Potenza e Marsico Nuovo ===
United: 27 June 1818 with Diocese of Marsico Nuovo
Latin Name: Potentinus et Marsicensis
Metropolitan: Archdiocese of Acerenza

- Giuseppe Maria Botticelli, O.F.M. (21 Feb 1820 – 1822)
- Pietro Ignazio Marolda, C.SS.R. (19 Apr 1822 – 1837)
- Michelangelo Pieramico (12 Feb 1838 – Sep 1862 Died)

Sede vacante (1862–1867)

- Antonio Maria Fanìa, O.F.M. (27 Mar 1867 – 23 Jan 1880 Died)
- Luigi Carvelli (23 Jan 1880 – 3 Jul 1882 Appointed, Bishop of Mileto)
- Tiberio Durante (25 Sep 1882 – 31 Oct 1899 Died)
- Ignacio Monterisi (19 Apr 1900 – 17 Feb 1913 Died)
- Roberto Achille Razzòli, O.F.M. (27 Aug 1913 – 27 Apr 1925 Died)
- Augusto Bertazzoni (30 Jun 1930 – 30 Nov 1966 Retired)
- Aureliano Sorrentino (30 Nov 1966 – 4 Jun 1977 Appointed, Archbishop of Reggio Calabria)

=== Archdiocese of Potenza e Marsico Nuovo ===
Elevated: 1973 Feb 11
Latin Name: Potentinus et Marsicensis

- Giuseppe Vairo (3 Dec 1977 – 19 Jan 1993 Retired)

=== Archdiocese of Potenza–Muro Lucano–Marsico Nuovo ===
United: 30 September 1986 with the Diocese of Muro Lucano
Latin Name: Archidioecesis Potentinus-Muranus-Marsicensis

- Ennio Appignanesi (19 Jan 1993 – 9 Jan 2001 Retired)
- Agostino Superbo (9 Jan 2001 – 5 Oct 2015 Retired)
- Salvatore Ligorio (5 Oct 2015 – )

== Bibliography ==
=== Reference for bishops ===
- Gams, Pius Bonifatius (1873). Series episcoporum Ecclesiae catholicae: quotquot innotuerunt a beato Petro apostolo (in Latin). Ratisbon: Typis et Sumptibus Georgii Josephi Manz. pp. 910–911.
- Eubel, Conradus, ed. (1913). Hierarchia catholica (in Latin). Vol. Tomus 1 (second ed.). Münster: Libreria Regensbergiana.
- Eubel, Conradus, ed. (1914). Hierarchia catholica (in Latin). Vol. Tomus 2 (second ed.). Münster: Libreria Regensbergiana.
- Gulik, Guilelmus (1923). Eubel, Conradus (ed.). Hierarchia catholica (in Latin). Vol. Tomus 3 (second ed.). Münster: Libreria Regensbergiana.
- Gauchat, Patritius (Patrice) (1935). Hierarchia catholica (in Latin). Vol. Tomus IV (1592-1667). Münster: Libraria Regensbergiana.
- Ritzler, Remigius; Sefrin, Pirminus (1952). Hierarchia catholica medii et recentis aevi V (1667-1730). Patavii: Messagero di S. Antonio.
- Ritzler, Remigius; Sefrin, Pirminus (1958). Hierarchia catholica medii et recentis aevi (in Latin). Vol. Tomus VI (1730-1799). Patavii: Messagero di S. Antonio.
- Ritzler, Remigius; Sefrin, Pirminus (1968). Hierarchia Catholica medii et recentioris aevi sive summorum pontificum, S. R. E. cardinalium, ecclesiarum antistitum series... A pontificatu Pii PP. VII (1800) usque ad pontificatum Gregorii PP. XVI (1846) (in Latin). Vol. VII. Monasterii: Libr. Regensburgiana.
- Remigius Ritzler; Pirminus Sefrin (1978). Hierarchia catholica Medii et recentioris aevi... A Pontificatu PII PP. IX (1846) usque ad Pontificatum Leonis PP. XIII (1903) (in Latin). Vol. VIII. Il Messaggero di S. Antonio.
- Pięta, Zenon (2002). Hierarchia catholica medii et recentioris aevi... A pontificatu Pii PP. X (1903) usque ad pontificatum Benedictii PP. XV (1922) (in Latin). Vol. IX. Padua: Messagero di San Antonio. ISBN 978-88-250-1000-8.

=== Studies ===
- Cappelletti, Giuseppe (1870). Le chiese d'Italia: dalla loro origine sino ai nostri giorni (in Italian). Vol. vigesimo (20). Venezia: G. Antonelli. pp. 417–452.
- D'Avino, Vincenzio (1848). Cenni storici sulle chiese arcivescovili, vescovili, e prelatizie (nullius) del regno delle due Sicilie (in Italian). Naples: dalle stampe di Ranucci. pp. 316–320.
- Kamp, Norbert (1975). Kirche und Monarchie im staufischen Königreich Sizilien. I. Prosopographische Grundlegung: 2. Apulien und Kalabrien. München: Wilhelm Fink Verlag. (in German) pp. 794-798.
- Kehr, Paul Fridolin (1962). Italia pontificia. Vol. IX: Samnium — Apulia — Lucania. Berlin: Weidmann. (in Latin)
- Lanzoni, Francesco (1927). Le diocesi d'Italia dalle origini al principio del secolo VII (an. 604). (in Italian) Faenza: F. Lega, pp. 325-329.
- Palestino, Carlo (2000). L' arcidiocesi di Potenza Muro Marsico (in Italian). S.T.E.S., 2000.
- Torelli, Felice (1848). La chiave del Concordato dell'anno 1818 e degli atti emanati posteriormente al medesimo. (in Italian) Volume 1, second edition Naples: Stamperia del Fibreno, 1848.
