= Fra Diavolo sauce =

Spicy Italian-American tomato sauce

Fra Diavolo
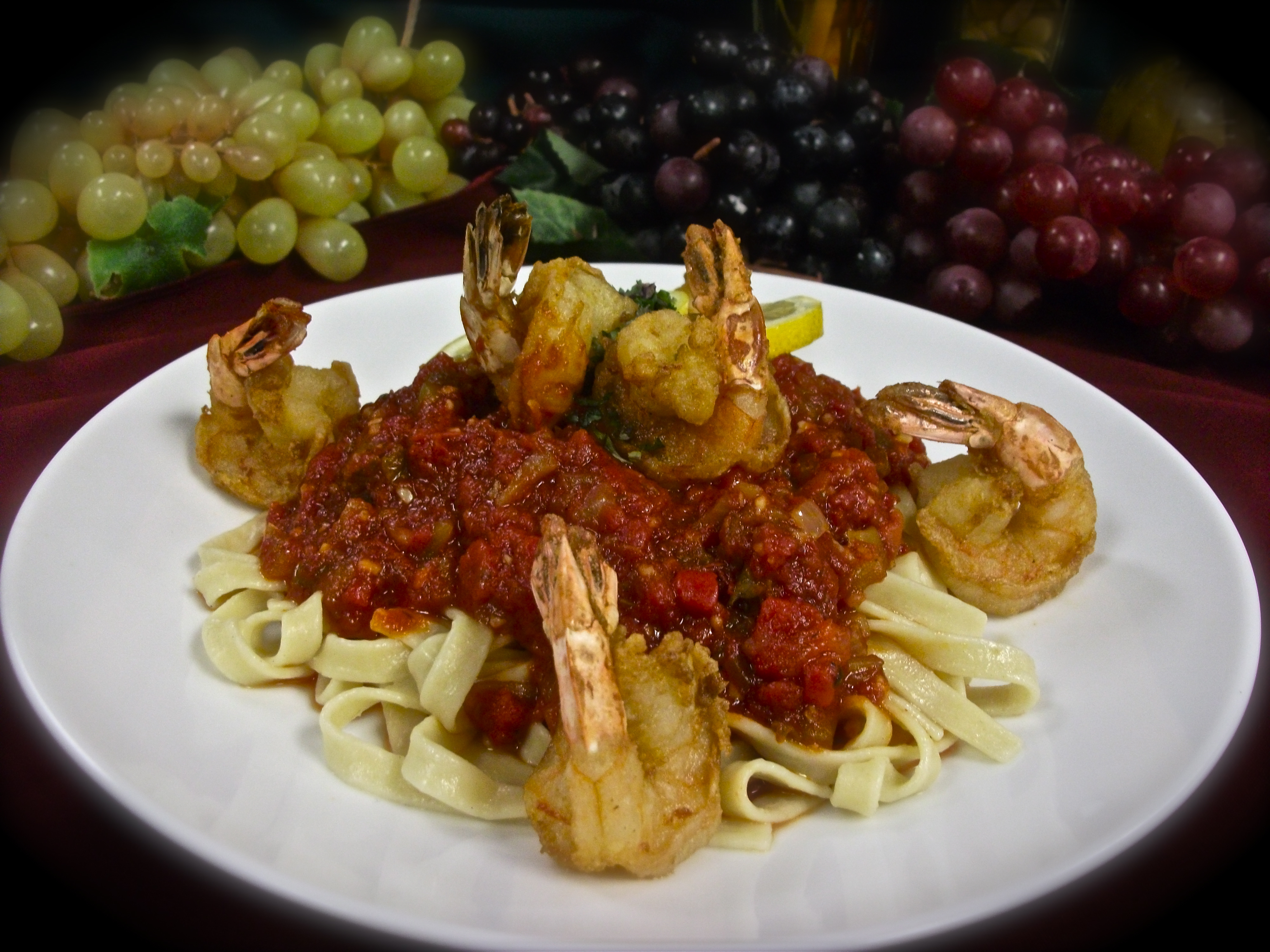
- Shrimp with Fra Diavolo sauce
- Type: Sauce
- Place of origin: United States
- Region or state: New York
- Associated cuisine: Italian American Cuisine

Fra Diavolo (from Fra Diavolo, nickname of 18th century guerrilla leader, in Italian "Brother Devil”) is a spicy Italian-American tomato sauce for pasta or seafood, made with crushed red pepper, garlic, and fresh herbs such as parsley and basil. The sauce is made by sauteing chopped onions in olive oil, then adding tomatoes (canned or fresh), crushed red pepper and garlic. Some recipes add white wine. Some versions of Chicken Fra Diavolo are made without tomato sauce.

It is unclear how "Fra Diavolo" became attached to the name of a deviled (i.e., spicy) sauce, but the name was possibly influenced either by the nickname of celebrated Italian guerrilla/bandit Michele Pezza, or the opera of the same name by Daniel Auber.
