= Itri =

- Comune
- Comune di Itri
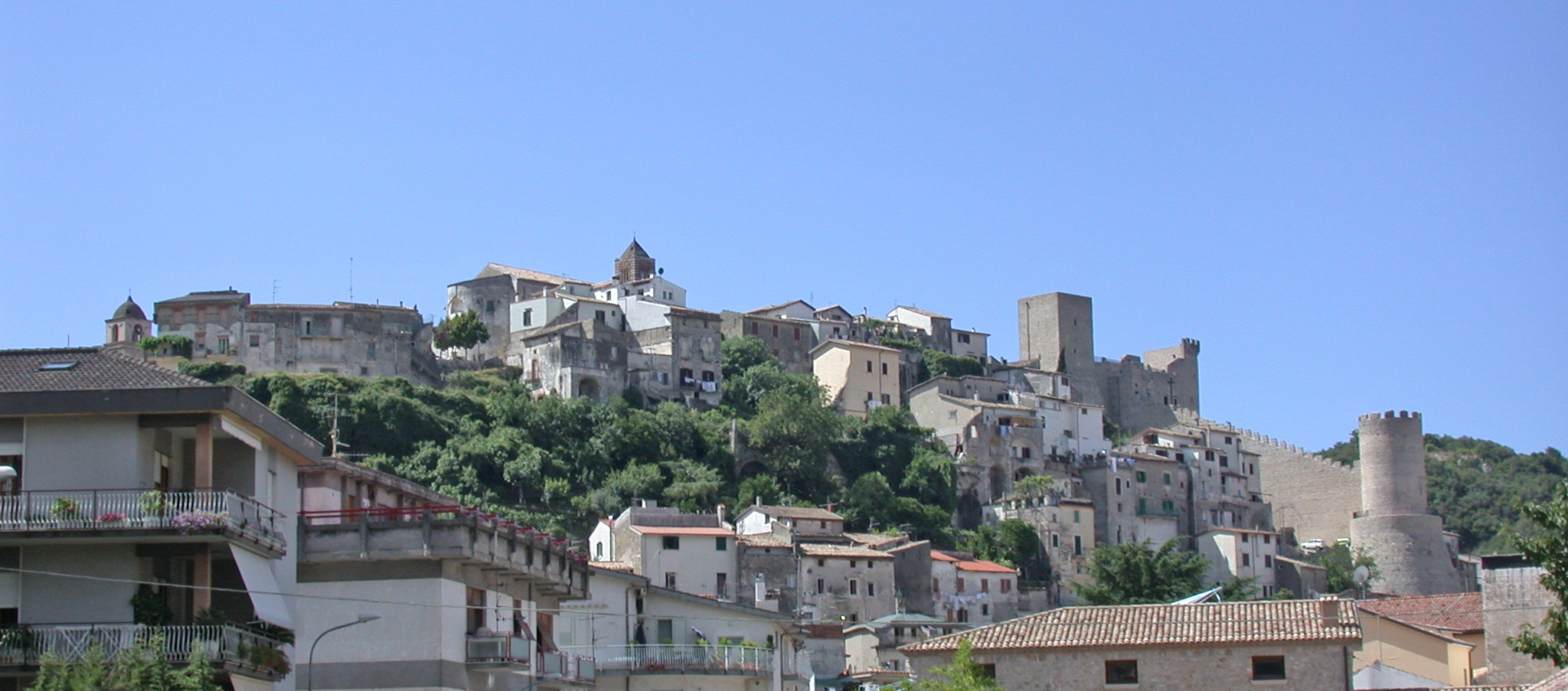
- Panorama of the Città alta of Itri, with the castle on the right

- Coat of arms

- Location within Italy Location within Lazio
- Coordinates: 41°17′N 13°32′E
- Country: Italy
- Region: Lazio
- Province: Latina (LT)

Government
  - Mayor: Andrea di Biase (Civic list)

Area
  - Total: 101 km^{2} (39 sq mi)
- Elevation: 170 m (560 ft)

Population (31 July 2021)
  - Total: 10,342
  - Density: 102/km^{2} (265/sq mi)
- Demonym: Itrani
- Time zone: UTC+1 (CET)
  - Summer (DST): UTC+2 (CEST)
- Postal code: 04020
- Dialing code: 0771
- ISTAT code: 059010
- Patron saint: Madonna della Civita
- Saint day: July 21
- Website: Official website

Itri is a small city and comune the province of Latina, Lazio, central Italy.

Itri is an agricultural centre divided in two parts by a small river, the Pontone. It lies in a valley between the Monti Aurunci and the sea, not far from the Gulf of Gaeta. The more ancient part, with the Castle, was partly destroyed during World War II.

The Itrani speak a particular variant of the Neapolitan language called Itrano.

== History ==
The first direct documentary record of Itri dates to 914, but settlements in the neighbourhood existed from prehistoric times, as proved by findings from the Neolithic and the Bronze Ages.

According to legend, Itri's origins appear to coincide with the destruction of Amyclae, a maritime city founded by the twin sons of Zeus, Castor and Pollux, whose Spartan followers clashed with Aeneas. The Greek colony was most likely on the coast at about 20 kilometres (12 mi) north of Fondi. Amyclae was founded between Lake Fondi and the Terracina coast, on the edge of the murky waters of the swamps present at the time. The quiet Amyclaeans were plagued by the cursed and numerous evil forces of the swamp, unstoppable beings such as the monstrous serpent with nine heads, the Lernaean Hydra, which attacked with poisonous venom, and whose heads would re-grow as quickly as Hercules could slice them off with his sword. The city of Amyclae was soon annihilated. The few survivors abandoned the city and relocated a few kilometers south to the area now known as Itri. These first inhabitants of Itri supposedly adopted the emblems of the "Signum Salutis", a serpent, as their symbol of power, and "Amycleus", the dog's head, as their symbol of fidelity.

More likely, Itri was probably a town or outpost of the Aurunci, later conquered and assimilated by the Romans.

The name Itri derives from the Latin word iter, meaning "route" or "way", appropriate since the city lies where the old Roman Via Appia, built in 312 BC, crosses the Monti Aurunci by way of a narrow pass, the Gola di Sant'Andrea, called by Charles Dickens a "noble mountain pass". An alternative hypothesis on the origin of the town's name suggest it derived from the cult of the Eastern God Mithra, as there is a large subterranean temple dedicated to him a few hundred meters south of the town. Still another suggestion is that it derives from the Greek for snake "hydra", pronounced in some dialects as "itra". In Roman times Itri would have been no more than a post station, a role it continued in until well into the nineteenth century; in Bourbon times Itri was the 12th of 18 posting stations going south from Rome to Naples.

In the Middle Ages the population grew, and three lines of walls were built to protect the people living around the castle. Itri was part of the duchy of Gaeta and was a possession of the Dell'Aquila family, dukes of Fondi. In modern times Itri was part of the Kingdom of Naples.

Due to its location on the Gola di Sant'Andrea, Itri has historically been the scene of much military activity and a number of important battles. Perhaps the most famous occurred in 1503 when Consalvo of Cordova defeated the French army under the command of the Duke of Nemours, an action known as the Battle of the Garigliano.

During World War II, Allied bombing destroyed 75 percent of the city edifices.

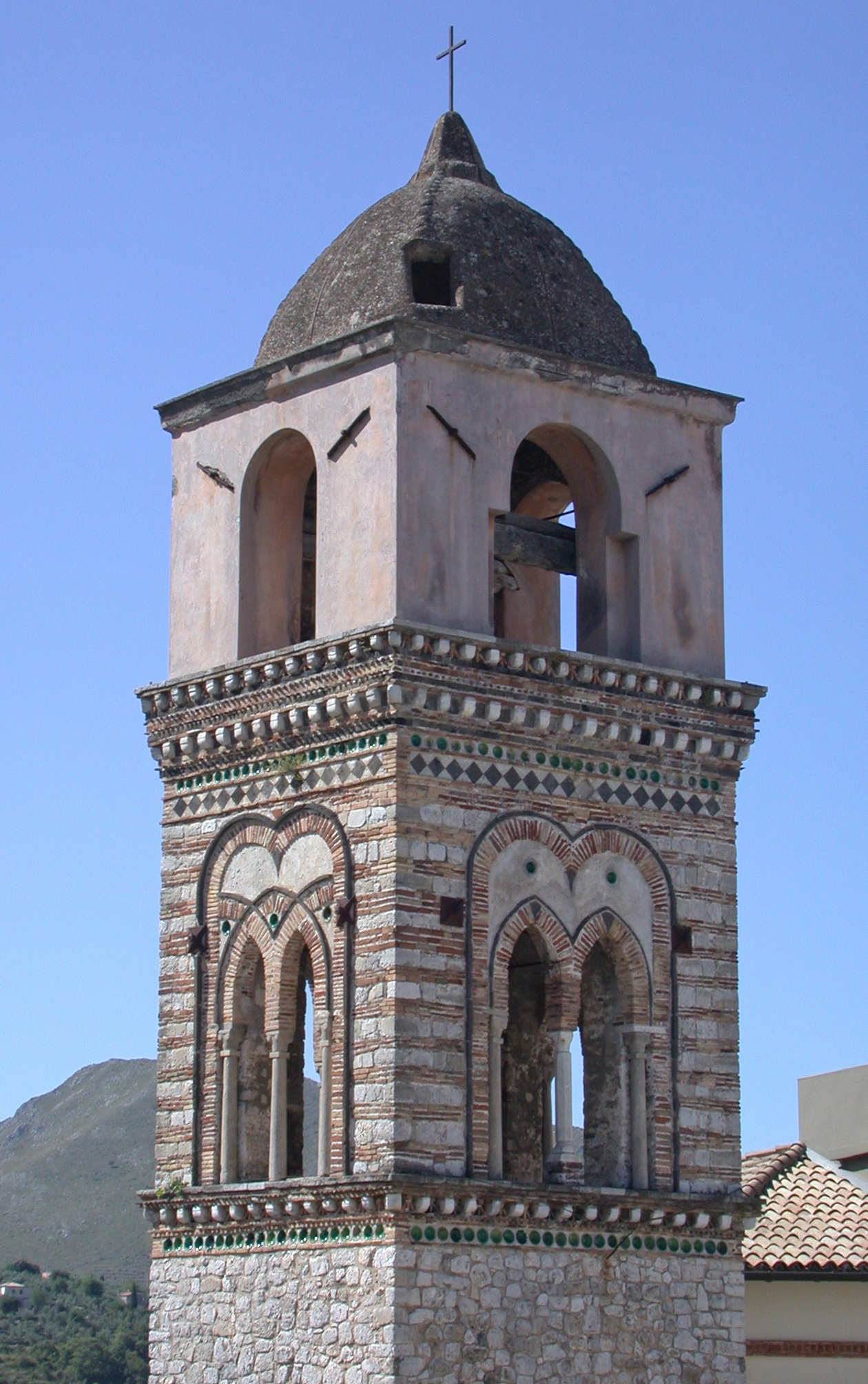
The bell tower of the destroyed church of Santa Maria Maggiore

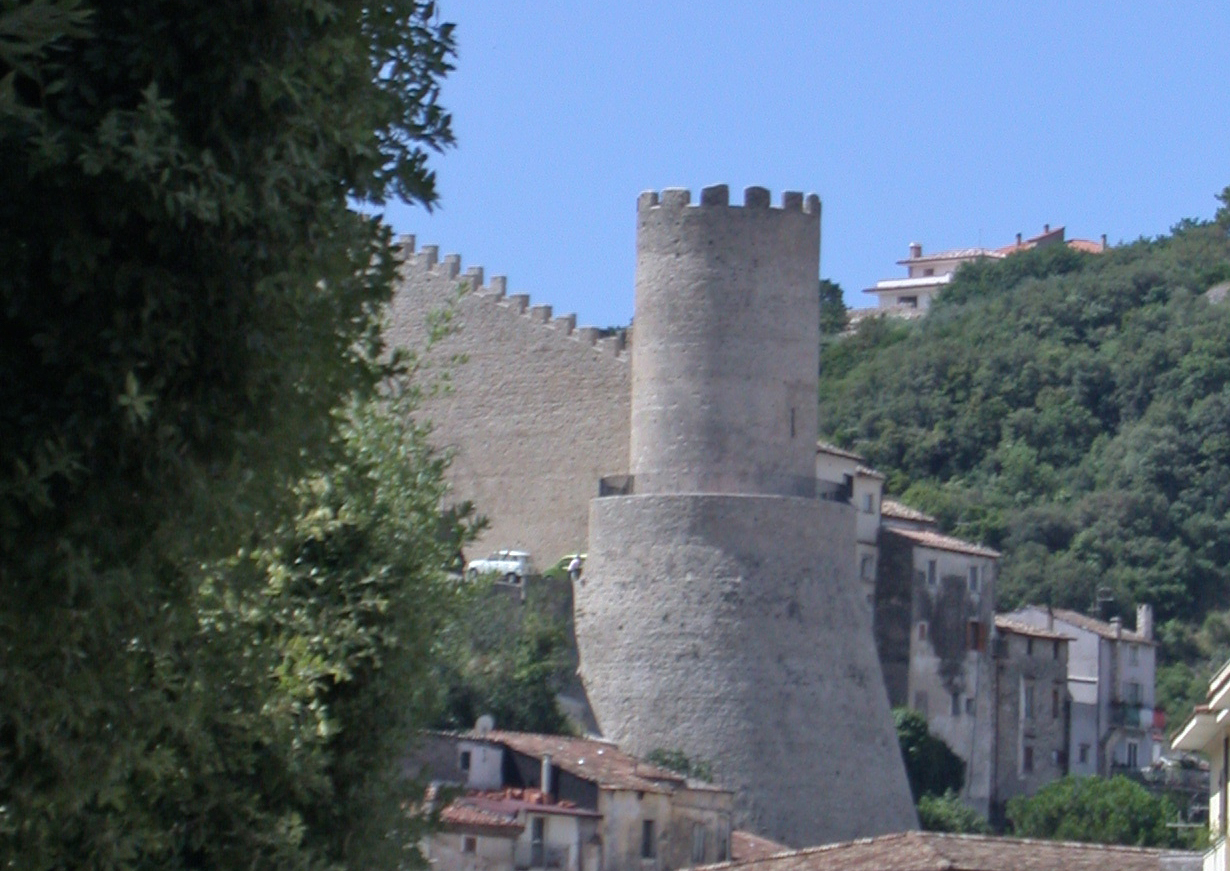
The Crocodile Tower

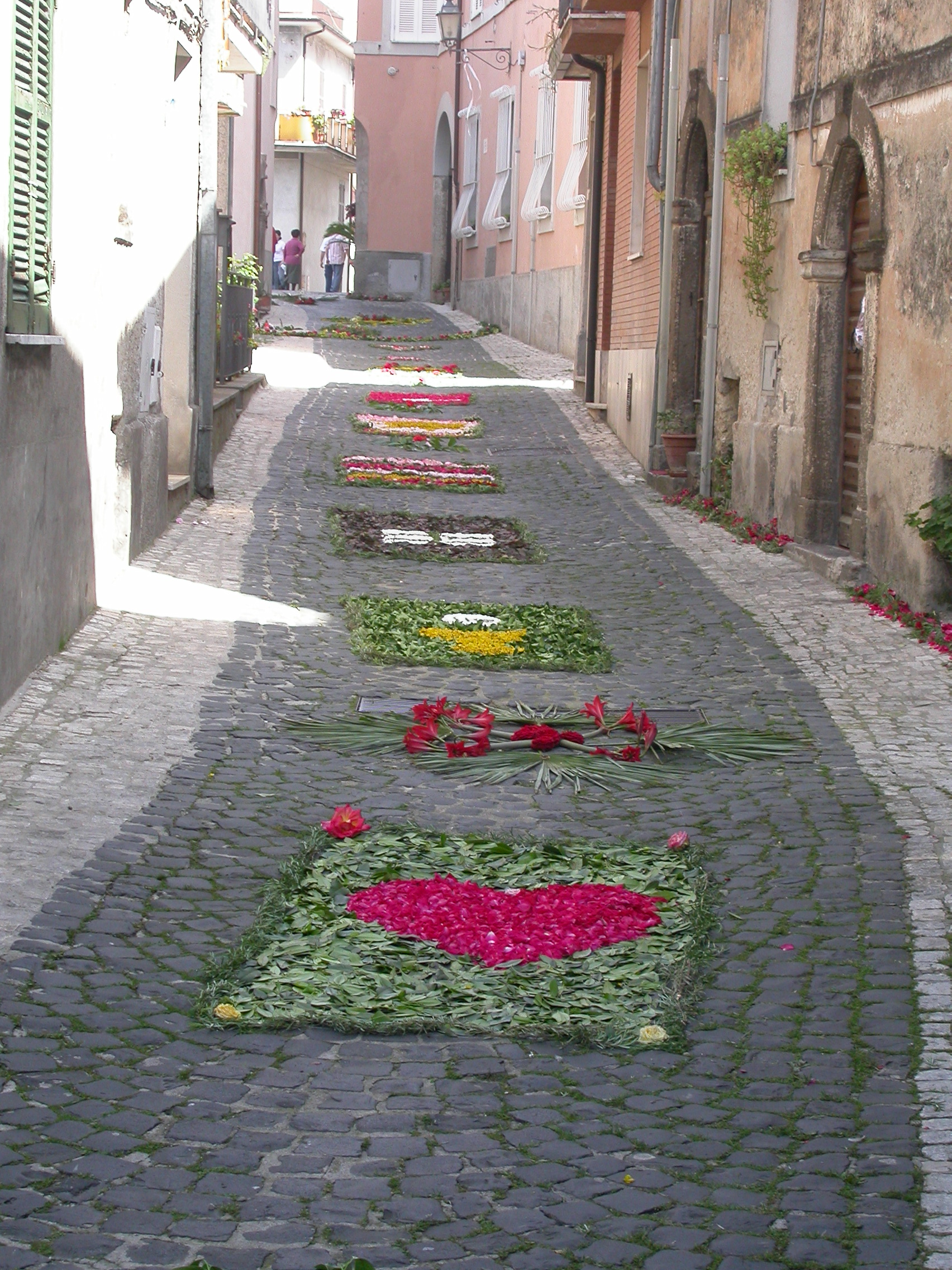
Infiorata on Via Della Repubblica

== Main sights ==
- The Castle, which commands all the neighbouring valley. It has a square tower merloned wall, attributed to Duke Docibilis I of Gaeta (882), to which his grandson Marinus II added a polygonal tower. A third tower, nicknamed del Coccodrillo ("Crocodile") is site in a lower position, directly over Via Appia. A third line of wall is from the mid-13th century.
- The church of San Michele Arcangelo (11th century), in Arabic-Norman style.
- The 12th-century bell tower of the destroyed church of St. Maria Maggiore, with Byzantine art-style decorations.
- The Sanctuary of the Madonna della Civita is located 12.7 kilometres (7.9 mi) from the city on a mountain once devoted to the Roman God Mercury with a splendid panorama. It houses a holy image of the Virgin, which, according to the legend, was painted by St. Luke. It was crowned here by Pope Pius VI, and again by Pius IX in 1877. King Ferdinand II of Naples visited the place in 1849.
- The Fortress of Sant'Andrea was built in the first century BC on the remains of an ancient Roman villa, located along the Old Via Appia in the direction of Fondi. This fortress was used by Fra Diavolo during the defensive operations against the French in 1798.
- The Church of Santa Maria di Loreto is located on a hill northeast from the center of the town. It is connected to the convent of the Cappuccini order. The painting of the Madonna of Loreto, created by 18th century Neapolitan artist Sarnelli, hangs above the church's altar.

== Patron saint ==
The Madonna della Civita is the patron saint of the town; her feast is celebrated on July 21.

Popular tradition narrates that the sacred painting representing the image of the Madonna was found in the 8th century by a deaf and mute shepherd, who was looking for a missing cow on Mount Civita. Upon discovering the painting, the mute shepherd fell to his knees, prayed, and miraculously was able to hear and speak for the first time in his life. He went back to the town to share his discovery with the Itrani, who were shocked and amazed to witness that the shepherd could now hear and speak.

The origin of the painting appears to be dated back to the 8th century, when the Byzantine Emperor Leo III ordered religious persecutions and banned the cult of sacred images.

== People ==
- Michele Pezza (Fra Diavolo)
- Pope Urban VI
- Paolo Burali d'Arezzo

== Culture ==
- On March 19 of each year, the people of Itri celebrate the feast of Saint Joseph (Festa di San Giuseppe), patron of the carpenters. The festivity is tied to a secular tradition, and on that night very large bonfires are ignited, around which people dance around, sing and prepare the traditional “zeppole di San Giuseppe”, a traditional fried dough made with sugar, eggs and coated with honey.
- The day of Corpus Domini (60 days after Easter), Itri celebrates L'Infiorata. An entire main street of the town, the via della Repubblica, is covered with a variety of different colored flower petals, used to reproduce sacred images and images of the town itself, such as the castle and its churches. At the end of the day, the religious procession passes over the floral masterpieces.
- The Feast of the Madonna della Civita is Itri's main attraction, celebrated typically on three consecutive days, July 20, 21 and 22. This is often an occasion for Itri's emigrants to return to their hometown. The 3-day feast is celebrated with religious processions, people walking up and down via Civita Farnese among amusement rides and hundreds of stands selling just about anything. Each night culminates with the performance of singers (with the most famous one performing on the last night of the celebrations) and spectacular fireworks.
  The neighborhood of Knightsville, Cranston, Rhode Island in the United States also celebrates this holiday because many immigrants from Itri moved there.
- On the first Sunday of August, Itri celebrates the most important product of its economy, the olive. The feast known as the Sagra dell'Ulivo is celebrated with oil (on bruschetta) and olive tastings. Folkloristic groups also sing and dance in the main piazza. Itri exports much of its olive oil and olives, under the denomination of "Gaeta Olives". The product adopted the name of the more known nearby city because they were shipped from the seaport of Gaeta.
- Among the traditional dishes prepared in Itri are the Pasta e Fagioli (pasta with beans), Polenta with Sausage Ragu, Risotto with Porcini Mushrooms, Linguine with Asparagus, grilled, roasted or sauteed wild game (such as wild boar, jackrabbit, pheasant, quails, and other local wild birds), and the delicious Marzolino cheese (a sheep's-milk cheese) made locally. Many of the dishes prepared with porcini, asparagus, truffles and wild game come from the remote woods of Itri's own Campello location.

== Sister city ==
- Cranston, United States

== Cultural references ==
- The movie Two Women ("La Ciociara") with Sofia Loren was filmed in Itri.
- The legendary Itrano combatant Michele Pezza was the inspiration for Daniel Auber's 3-act opera Fra Diavolo, and the 1933 Laurel and Hardy film, The Devil's Brother.
