= Giacomo Nini =

Italian Catholic bishop (f. 1506–1521)

Most Reverend Giacomo Nini
- Bishop of Potenza
- Church: Catholic Church
- Diocese: Diocese of Potenza
- In office: 1506–1521
- Predecessor: Jaime Serra i Cau
- Successor: Pompeo Colonna

Giacomo Nini was a Roman Catholic prelate who served as Bishop of Potenza (1506–1521).

== Biography ==
On 7 Aug 1506, Giacomo Nini was appointed by Pope Julius II as Bishop of Potenza. He served as Bishop of Potenza until his resignation in 1521.

== External links and additional sources ==
- Cheney, David M. "Archdiocese of Potenza-Muro Lucano-Marsico Nuovo". Catholic-Hierarchy.org. (for Chronology of Bishops) ^{[self-published]}
- Chow, Gabriel. "Metropolitan Archdiocese of Potenza–Muro Lucano–Marsico Nuovo (Italy)". GCatholic.org. (for Chronology of Bishops) ^{[self-published]}

Catholic Church titles
Preceded by Jaime Serra i Cau	Bishop of Potenza; 1506–1521	Succeeded by Pompeo Colonna
