= Baldassare de Benavente =

Italian Roman Catholic prelate

Most Reverend Baldassare de Benavente
- Bishop of Potenza
- Church: Catholic Church
- Diocese: Diocese of Potenza
- In office: 1686–1687
- Predecessor: Luigi de Filippi
- Successor: Pietro de Torres

Orders
- Consecration: 19 May 1686 by Alessandro Crescenzi (cardinal)

Personal details
- Born: 1 March 1638 Salamanca, Spain
- Died: 30 October 1687 (aged 49) Potenza, Italy

Baldassare de Benavente, O. de M. (1 March 1638 – 30 October 1687) was a Roman Catholic prelate who served as Bishop of Potenza (1686–1687).

== Biography ==
Baldassare de Benavente was born in Salamanca, Spain on 1 March 1638 and ordained a priest in the Order of the Blessed Virgin Mary of Mercy. On 12 December 1685, he was selected as Bishop of Potenza and confirmed by Pope Innocent XI on 13 May 1686. On 19 May 1686, he was consecrated bishop by Alessandro Crescenzi (cardinal), Cardinal-Priest of Santa Prisca, with Pier Antonio Capobianco, Bishop Emeritus of Lacedonia, and Francesco Onofrio Hodierna, Bishop of Bitetto, serving as co-consecrators. He served as Bishop of Potenza until his death on 30 October 1687.

== External links and additional sources ==
- Cheney, David M. "Archdiocese of Potenza-Muro Lucano-Marsico Nuovo". Catholic-Hierarchy.org. (for Chronology of Bishops) ^{[self-published]}
- Chow, Gabriel. "Metropolitan Archdiocese of Potenza–Muro Lucano–Marsico Nuovo (Italy)". GCatholic.org. (for Chronology of Bishops) ^{[self-published]}

Catholic Church titles
Preceded by Luigi de Filippi	Bishop of Potenza; 1686–1687	Succeeded by Pietro de Torres
