= Achille Caracciolo =

Most Reverend Achille Caracciolo
- Bishop of Potenza
- Church: Catholic Church
- Diocese: Diocese of Potenza
- In office: 1616–1623
- Predecessor: Gaspare Cardoso
- Successor: Diego Vargas

Orders
- Consecration: 3 May 1616 by Giovanni Garzia Mellini

Personal details
- Died: 1623 Potenza, Italy

Achille Caracciolo (died 1623) was a Roman Catholic prelate who served as Bishop of Potenza (1616–1623).

== Biography ==
On 2 May 1616, Achille Caracciolo was appointed during the papacy of Pope Paul V as Bishop of Potenza. On 2 May 1616, he was consecrated bishop by Giovanni Garzia Mellini, Cardinal-Priest of Santi Quattro Coronati with Giovanni Battista del Tufo, Bishop Emeritus of Acerra, and Paolo De Curtis, Bishop Emeritus of Isernia, serving as co-consecrators. He served as Bishop of Potenza until his death in 1623.

== External links and additional sources ==
- Cheney, David M. "Archdiocese of Potenza-Muro Lucano-Marsico Nuovo". Catholic-Hierarchy.org. (for Chronology of Bishops) ^{[self-published]}
- Chow, Gabriel. "Metropolitan Archdiocese of Potenza–Muro Lucano–Marsico Nuovo (Italy)". GCatholic.org. (for Chronology of Bishops) ^{[self-published]}

Catholic Church titles
Preceded by Gaspare Cardoso	Bishop of Potenza; 1616–1623	Succeeded by Diego Vargas
