= Diego Lozano González =

Italian Roman Catholic prelate

Most Reverend Diego Lozano González
- Bishop of Potenza
- Church: Catholic Church
- In office: 1677–1681
- Predecessor: Bonaventura Claverio
- Successor: Luigi de Filippi

Orders
- Ordination: 24 Feb 1646 by Timoteo Pérez Vargas
- Consecration: 19 Sep 1677 by Carlo Pio di Savoia

Personal details
- Born: 20 July 1622 Madrid, Spain
- Died: 10 September 1681 (aged 59) Potenza, Italy

Diego Lozano González, O. Carm. (1622–1681) was a Roman Catholic prelate who served as Bishop of Potenza (1677–1681).

== Biography ==
Diego Lozano González was born on 20 Jul 1622 in Madrid, Spain and ordained a priest on 24 Feb 1646 in the Order of the Brothers of the Blessed Virgin Mary of Mount Carmel by Timoteo Pérez Vargas, Titular Bishop of Lystra. On 15 Mar 1677, he was selected by the King of Spain and confirmed by Pope Innocent XI on 13 Sep 1677 as Bishop of Potenza. On 19 Sep 1677, he was consecrated bishop by Carlo Pio di Savoia, Cardinal-Priest of San Crisogono, with Giovanni Antonio Melzi, Archbishop of Capua, and Ludovico Ciogni, Bishop of Venafro, serving as co-consecrators. He served as Bishop of Potenza until his death on 10 Sep 1681.

== External links and additional sources ==
- Cheney, David M. "Archdiocese of Potenza-Muro Lucano-Marsico Nuovo". Catholic-Hierarchy.org. (for Chronology of Bishops) ^{[self-published]}
- Chow, Gabriel. "Metropolitan Archdiocese of Potenza–Muro Lucano–Marsico Nuovo (Italy)". GCatholic.org. (for Chronology of Bishops) ^{[self-published]}

Catholic Church titles
Preceded by Bonaventura Claverio	Bishop of Potenza; 1677–1681	Succeeded by Luigi de Filippi
