= Sanfedismo =

1799 anti-Jacobin movement in Naples

Army of Holy Faith in our Lord Jesus Christ
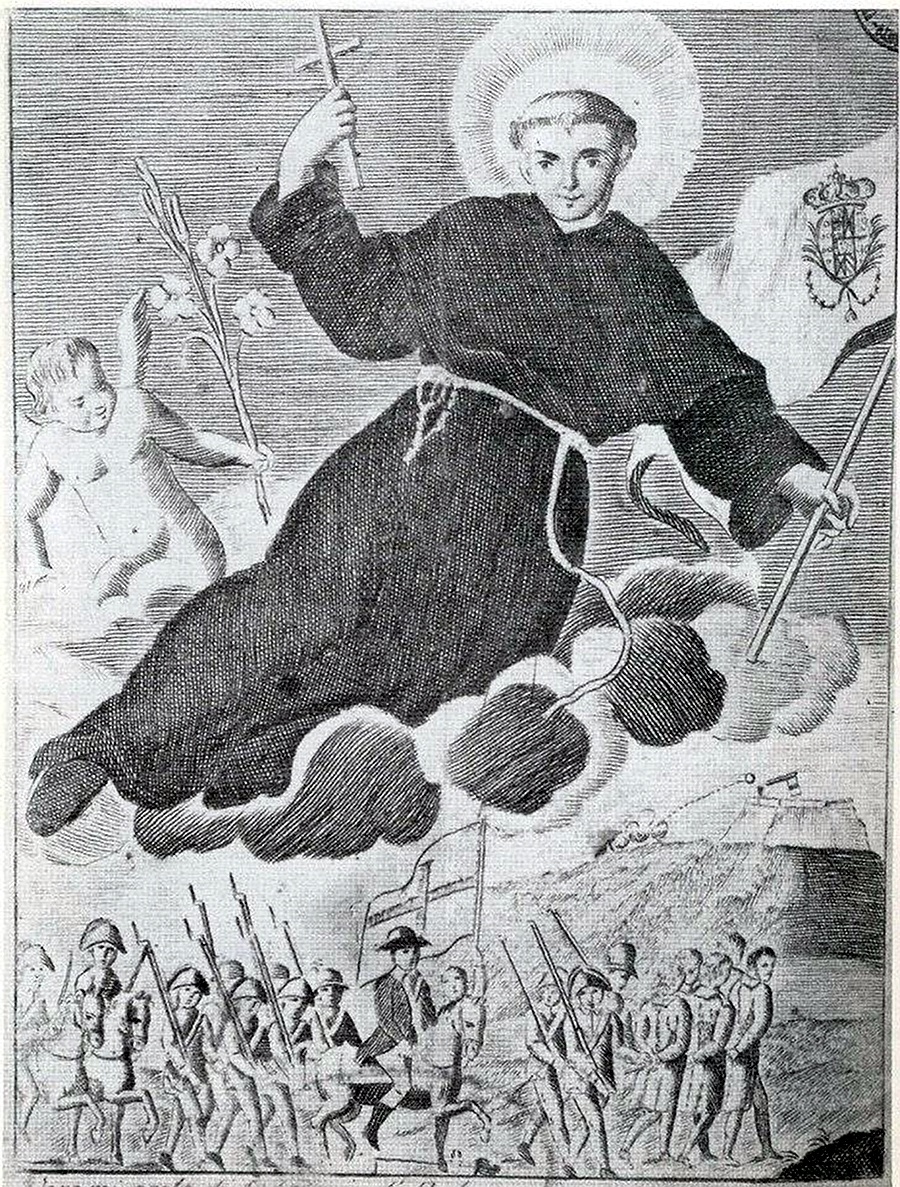
- Fabrizio Cardinal Ruffo leading the Sanfedisti in 1799, protected by Saint Anthony
- Leader: Fabrizio Cardinal Ruffo
- Dates active: 1799
- Group: Southern Italian peasants
- Active regions: Southern Italy
- Size: 17,000
- Wars: Revolt against Parthenopaean Republic

Sanfedismo (from Santa Fede, "Holy Faith" in Italian) was a popular anti-Jacobin movement, organized by Fabrizio Cardinal Ruffo, which mobilized peasants of the Kingdom of Naples against the pro-French Parthenopaean Republic in 1799, its aims culminating in the restoration of the Monarchy under Ferdinand I of the Two Sicilies. Its full name was the Army of Holy Faith in our Lord Jesus Christ (Italian: Armata della Santa Fede in nostro Signore Gesù Cristo), and its members were called Sanfedisti.

The terms Santafede, Sanfedismo and Sanfedisti (sometimes rendered in English as 'Sanfedism' and 'Sanfedist') are sometimes used more generally to refer to any religiously motivated, improvised peasant army that sprung up on the Italian peninsula to resist the newly created French client republics.

== Campaign ==
Cardinal Ruffo recruited the Sanfedisti in his native Calabria. His recruiting poster of February 1799 reads:

"Brave and courageous Calabrians, unite now under the standard of the Holy Cross and of our beloved sovereign. Do not wait for the enemy to come and contaminate our home neighbourhoods. Let us march to confront him, to repel him, to hunt him out of our kingdom and out of Italy and to break the barbarous chains of our holy Pontiff. May the banner of the Holy Cross secure you total victory."

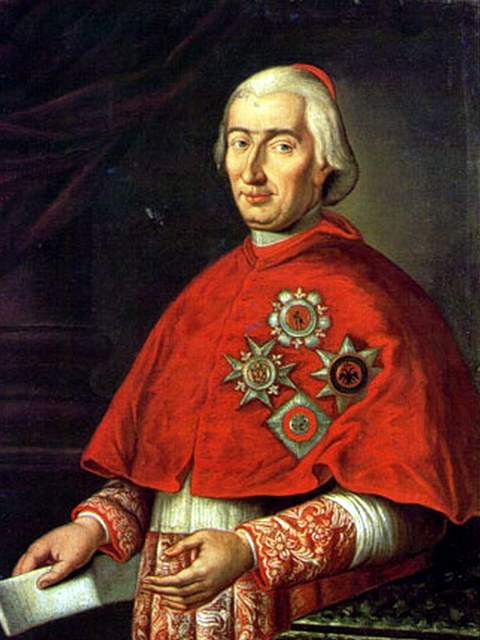
Cardinal Fabrizio Ruffo.

The Sanfedismo movement nominally acted on behalf of Ferdinand I of the Two Sicilies. On January 25, 1799, two days after the proclamation of the Parthenopean Republic, Ferdinand appointed Ruffo, while both were taking refuge in Palermo, Sicily, to act as his vicar-general on the Italian mainland. Ruffo landed in Calabria on February 7 with no money or weapons and only eight companions, but bearing a banner with the royal arms on one side and a cross on the other, also bearing the ancient slogan "In hoc signo vinces." It took Ruffo a month to amass a force of 17,000; mostly peasants, but also "bandits, ecclesiastics, mercenaries, looters, devotees, and assassins."

During the campaign, Ruffo corresponded with Ferdinand's agent, Sir John Acton, 6th Baronet, updating him on the military progress of the Sanfedisti:

- "I beg the king [of Naples] to order at least a thousand handguns and many loads of lead shot to be sent to me" (February 12)
- "I think it would be expedient to send a frigate with a mortar against Crotone and to destroy it absolutely" (February 26)
- "Catanzaro has really surrendered; many of the worst fellows have been massacred, others taken prisoner" (March 8)
- "Cosenza has been taken and sacked" (March 19)

By the end of April, the Sanfedisti had subdued the entirety of Calabria, Basilicata and most of Apulia, and by June had begun a land siege of the city of Naples. In the siege, the Sanfedismo irregulars were supported by the British Royal Navy under the command of Admiral Horatio Nelson, for which Ferdinand gave Nelson the title of Duke of Bronte, which Nelson affixed to his signature for the rest of his life. The Parthenopean Republic collapsed on June 19, 1799.

Most of the Sanfedisti victories occurred in rugged terrain, which was "well-suited" to the irregular style of warfare employed by Ruffo.

Similar to other anti-French uprisings in Italy, the Sanfedisti were not, as a rule, amiable towards Radicals, Freemasons and Jews, who were perceived as supporters of the Enlightenment ideology. Furthermore, Bishop Giovanni Andrea Serrao, the Jansenist leader in southern Italy and despite being a supporter of the Parthenopaean Republic, was summarily executed on February 24, 1799, by the Republican soldiers of the Potenza garrison, as Ruffo's forces were drawing near to the city.

== Legacy ==
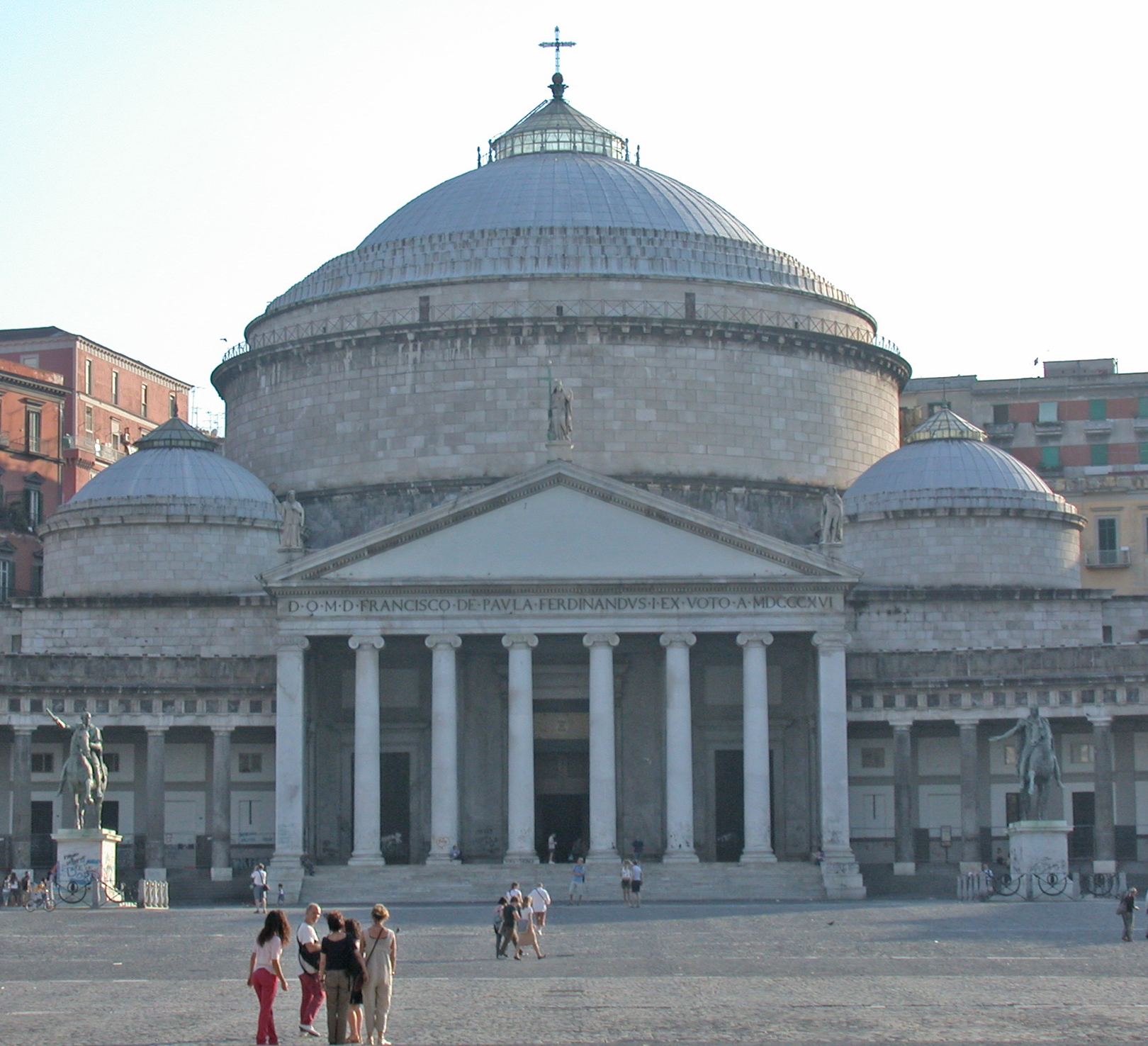
Church of San Francesco da Paola, Naples, in a ponderous academic neoclassical style, completed in 1816 as Ferdinand's ex voto for his return.

The role of Cardinal Ruffo in the movement was a contemporary source of controversy, attributing to Ruffo both cruelty and bloodlust; apologist writings defending him are only extant with respect to the sack of Altamura. The name of Sanfedismo itself was a source of criticism, dubbed "a word sprung up, by which this new phase of wickedness might be called" by a contemporary. Sanfedismo, and Ruffo himself, became synonymous with the "recalcitrant, truly counter-revolutionary clergy" as opposed to those who were more sympathetic to the French Revolution. The name "Sanfedisti" was also used by Bourbonist peasant uprisings against the House of Savoy during Italian unification.

The Canto dei Sanfedisti is still remembered by heart among many in the Mezzogiorno, and sometimes sung by folk groups. It is a parody of La Carmagnole, a popular French Revolutionary song.

Later scholarly views of the Sanfedisti have dubbed them a "counter-revolutionary" group, but not homogeneously a "reaction[ary]" one.

== See also ==
- Veronese Easters
- Viva Maria
- Vendée Revolt
- Carlism
- Miguelism
- Fra Diavolo
