= Pietro de Torres =

Italian Catholic bishop (1634–1709)

Most Reverend Pietro de Torres
- Archbishop of Trani
- Church: Catholic Church
- Archdiocese: Archdiocese of Trani
- In office: 1695–1709
- Predecessor: Pablo Jiménez Alejandro
- Successor: Giuseppe Antonio Davanzati
- Previous posts: Archbishop of Dubrovnik (1665–1689); Archbishop (Personal Title) of Potenza (1689–1695),

Personal details
- Born: 12 December 1634 Trani, Italy
- Died: October 1709 (age 74) Trani, Italy

Pietro de Torres (1634–1709) was a Roman Catholic prelate who served as Archbishop of Trani (1695–1709), Archbishop (Personal Title) of Potenza (1689–1695), and Archbishop of Dubrovnik (1665–1689).

== Biography ==
Pietro de Torres was born in Trani, Italy and ordained a priest on 1 August 1660. On 12 January 1665, he was appointed during the papacy of Pope Alexander VII as Archbishop of Dubrovnik. On 24 January 1689, he was appointed during the papacy of Pope Innocent XI as Archbishop (Personal Title) of Potenza. On 24 March 1694, he was selected as Archbishop of Trani and confirmed by Pope Innocent XII on 24 January 1695. He served as Archbishop of Trani until his death in October 1709.

== Episcopal succession ==
While bishop, Torres was the principal co-consecrator of:

- Giovanni Alfonso Petrucci, Bishop of Belcastro (1686)
- Giacomo Porrata, Bishop of Noli (1687);
- Francesco Gori, Bishop of Catanzaro (1687);
- Bartolomeo Rosa, Bishop of Lavello (1688);
- Domenico Morelli (bishop), Bishop of Lucera (1688);
- Alessandro Avio, Bishop of Pesaro (1688);
- Domenico Maria Marchese, Bishop of Pozzuoli (1688;)
- Pietro Antonio d'Alessandro, Bishop of San Marco (1688);
- Andrea de Rossi (archbishop), Archbishop of Rossano (1688);
- Baldassarre Nosadini, Bishop of Krk (1688); and
- Manuel de la Torre Gutiérrez, Archbishop of Lanciano (1688).

== External links and additional sources ==
- Cheney, David M. "Diocese of Dubrovnik (Ragusa)". Catholic-Hierarchy.org. (for Chronology of Bishops) ^{[self-published]}
- Chow, Gabriel. "Diocese of Dubrovnik (Croatia)". GCatholic.org. (for Chronology of Bishops) ^{[self-published]}
- Cheney, David M. "Archdiocese of Potenza-Muro Lucano-Marsico Nuovo". Catholic-Hierarchy.org. (for Chronology of Bishops) ^{[self-published]}
- Chow, Gabriel. "Metropolitan Archdiocese of Potenza–Muro Lucano–Marsico Nuovo (Italy)". GCatholic.org. (for Chronology of Bishops) ^{[self-published]}
- Cheney, David M. "Archdiocese of Trani-Barletta-Bisceglie (-Nazareth)". Catholic-Hierarchy.org. (for Chronology of Bishops) ^{[self-published]}
- Chow, Gabriel. "Archdiocese of Trani-Barletta-Bisceglie (Italy)". GCatholic.org. (for Chronology of Bishops) ^{[self-published]}

Catholic Church titles
| Preceded by Francesco Perotti | Archbishop of Dubrovnik; 1665–1689 | Succeeded by Giovanni Vincenzo Lucchesini |
| Preceded by Baldassare de Benavente | Archbishop (Personal Title) of Potenza; 1689–1695 | Succeeded by Agnello Rossi |
| Preceded by Pablo Jiménez Alejandro | Archbishop of Trani; 1695–1709 | Succeeded by Giuseppe Antonio Davanzati |
