= Diego Vargas (bishop) =

Most Reverend Diego Vargas
- Bishop of Potenza
- Church: Catholic Church
- Diocese: Diocese of Potenza
- In office: 1626–1633
- Predecessor: Achille Caracciolo
- Successor: Girolamo Magnesi

Personal details
- Died: October 1633 Potenza, Italy

Diego Vargas (died October 1633) was a Roman Catholic prelate who served as Bishop of Potenza (1626–1633).

== Biography ==
On 20 July 1626, Diego Vargas was appointed by Pope Urban VIII as Bishop of Potenza. He served as Bishop of Potenza until his death in October 1633.

== External links and additional sources ==
- Cheney, David M. "Archdiocese of Potenza-Muro Lucano-Marsico Nuovo". Catholic-Hierarchy.org. (for Chronology of Bishops) ^{[self-published]}
- Chow, Gabriel. "Metropolitan Archdiocese of Potenza–Muro Lucano–Marsico Nuovo (Italy)". GCatholic.org. (for Chronology of Bishops) ^{[self-published]}

Catholic Church titles
Preceded by Achille Caracciolo	Bishop of Potenza; 1626–1633	Succeeded by Girolamo Magnesi
