= Fra Diavolo =

Italian colonel and guerilla leader (1771–1806)

Michele Pezza
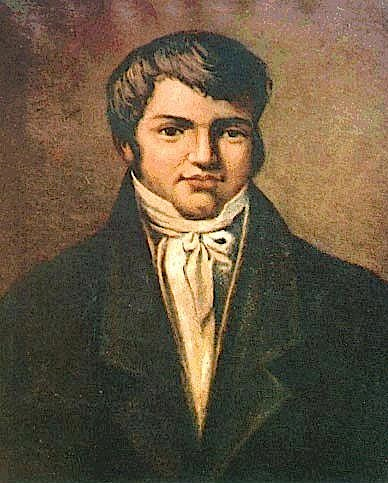
- Born: 7 April 1771; Itri, Kingdom of Naples
- Died: 11 November 1806 (aged 35); Naples, Kingdom of Naples
- Other name: Fra Diavolo
- Organization: Sanfedismo

Fra Diavolo (lit. Brother Devil; 7 April 1771–11 November 1806) is the popular name given to Michele Pezza, a guerrilla leader who resisted the French occupation of Naples, proving an "inspirational practitioner of popular insurrection". Pezza figures prominently in folk lore and fiction. He appears in several works of Alexandre Dumas, including The Last Cavalier: Being the Adventures of Count Sainte-hermine in the Age of Napoleon, not published in English until 2007 and in Washington Irving's short story "The Inn at Terracina". He received the nickname as a child after behaving naughtily while dressed as a monk for a procession.

== Biography ==
The nickname "Fra Diavolo" came about due to an old Itrano custom: Until early in the twentieth century Itrani boys and girls who had recently recovered from serious illnesses were dressed as monks on the second Sunday after Easter, for a procession in honor of St. Francis of Paola, the patron of sick children. On one of these solemn occasions little Michele, who was apparently a handful to begin with, proved so naughty that someone called him "Fra Diavolo" (Brother Devil) which stuck.

=== Early life ===
The notion that Pezza "was born of low parentage" has received wide circulation but is hardly accurate; it forms part of a hostile tradition derived from French propaganda. The Pezzas had some land in olives and were also engaged in the wool trade. The family home has some interesting architectural details, which also suggests some wealth, and they were related to several of the most prominent families in Itri, such as the Ialongo and the Pennachia.

Although little is known with certainty of his early life, Pezza learned to read and write, hardly a common accomplishment at the time, and further indication of some wealth in the family. As a young man he secured employment as a courier for the Neapolitan Royal Mail, making the 240 km (149 mi) round trip between Terracina and Naples twice a week for 50 ducats a year, a considerable sum, while becoming intimately familiar with the local terrain, which had a reputation for brigandage, knowledge that would later serve him in good stead. In 1797, while so employed, he vied for the affections of a young woman with another young man. One night his rival and another man ambushed Pezza, intending to do him some harm. Pezza, who reportedly had a "fiery temper", managed to kill both of his attackers. He took to the hills, but was soon caught. Tried, he was convicted of manslaughter, since the slaying had been committed in self-defense, and on 25 October 1797 he was sentenced to a tour in the army in lieu of prison.

On 20 January 1798 Pezza was enrolled in the Reggimento di Messapi, stationed at Fondi, about a dozen miles north of Itri and perhaps a dozen south of the frontier with the Papal States. Pezza rose quickly, becoming a sergeant, probably because he was literate and, as a member of the middle class and a former Royal courier, already familiar with firearms. In November of late 1798 Pezza took part in the disastrous attempt of the Neapolitan Army to oust the French from the Papal States.

The French responded quickly to the Neapolitan incursion, forcing them to retreat, and then undertook an invasion of the Kingdom of Naples. Plagued by cold and heavy rains, the Neapolitans fell back along the Appian Way. Thousands of troops deserted and many more were captured. Pezza, who was with the rear guard, was almost captured by the French, but escaped by donning peasant dress, and took to the hills above Itri. During the retreat, the Neapolitan Reggimento di Lucania fortified an old Roman sanctuary, the Fortino di San Andrea, located about a few miles northwest of Itri, where a pass carries the Appian Way over the Aurunci Mountains. On 26 December, reinforced by some irregulars hastily recruited by Pezza, the regiment ambushed elements of the French "Polish Legion", touching off a three-day skirmish. Unable to get through the easily defended defile, some French troops passed down the coast road, along the ancient Via Flacca, from Terracina to capture Sperlonga. The weather was foul, very cold with incessant rains that turned to ice. From Sperlonga, the French began working their way overland across the mountains, to outflank the Neapolitans at the old villa, and by dawn on the 29th were in position to attack. But the French movement had been detected by Pezza's irregulars, who were patrolling the hills, and they guided the Neapolitan troops safely out of the encirclement, so that they could fall back on the great fortress of Gaeta, about 15 miles down the coast. The French pressed on, and over the next few weeks, despite unusually cold and icy weather, overran the rest of Naples, capturing the city itself on 22 January 1799 and proclaiming the Parthenopaean Republic. For Pezza, the most critical event of this period occurred on 30 December, when French and Polish troops captured Itri. A band of peasants from the vicinity attempted to resist, but were rapidly overcome. The invaders then shot their prisoners, plundered the town a bit, proclaimed a new age of freedom, erected a "Liberty Tree", and held a ball.

=== Resistance to French rule 1798–1799 ===
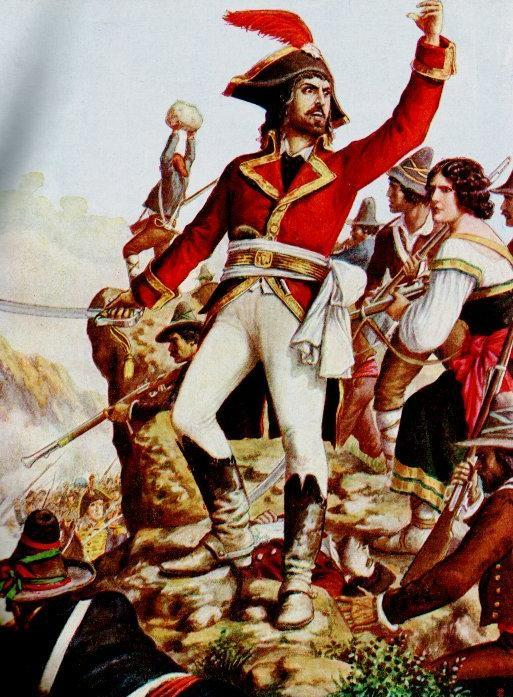
Fra Diavolo & Bands of the Holy Faith.

Though many reform-minded nobles and some intellectuals backed it, the French puppet regime in Naples, the Parthenopaean Republic, had little popular support. In addition, French and Polish troops acted abominably; looting and rape were common. French atrocities were so blatant that their commander in Naples, General Jean Étienne Championnet, was sacked by Guillaume-Charles Faipoult, one of the government representatives on mission, and subsequently imprisoned.

Irregular resistance had begun almost as soon as the invaders entered the country, and French atrocities only served to send more young men into the hills to join the insurgency. Attacks on French soldiers became common. The French retaliated swiftly and brutally, which only made matters worse. The experience of Itri was typical. On 15 January two French soldiers were killed while patrolling the Appian Way near the town. The next day a mixed force of French and Polish troops inflicted severe reprisals on the town, looting, raping, and murdering, leaving 60 men, women, and children lying dead in the streets; Michele Pezza's 67-year-old father was among the dead.

Meanwhile, although in exile in Sicily, the Neapolitan government, effectively controlled by Queen Maria Carolina, wife of King Ferdinand IV of Naples, appointed Fabrizio Ruffo, a progressive government minister and one of the last laymen to hold the dignity of cardinal in the Roman Catholic Church, to organize a resistance movement. On 8 February 1799, British and Neapolitan ships landed 5,000 troops and volunteers under Ruffo's command in Calabria. This force soon expanded into an unruly army of laymen and clerics, nobles and peasants, rich and poor, men, women, and children. Dubbed la Armata cristiana della Santa Fede ("the Christian Army of the Holy Faith"), this horde made up for its lack of training and equipment with enthusiasm, ferocity, and suicidal courage.

Pezza had already organized a small band of irregulars in the northern part of the Terra di Lavoro, and soon became one of Ruffo's principal subordinate commanders. His massa ("band") quickly grew to some 4,000 men, including his three brothers and the scions of a number of the leading families of Itri, such as Pasquale-Maria Nofi, who served as his adjutant with the rank of lieutenant. With these men, he raided French outposts far and wide. On one occasion he slipped into heavily occupied Fondi in the guise of a priest — thus becoming once again "Fra Diavolo" — to cut down the "Liberty Tree" which the French had planted there, replacing it with a cross that still stands. He even harassed French forces holding Gaeta, the great fortress dominating the northwestern route into the Kingdom of Naples, ambushing supply trains (once making off with 1,400 sheep) and couriers. Pezza made the Fortino di San Andrea his base of operations, and spread terror against French supporters over a wide area. He soon had a substantial price on his head.

The city of Naples was liberated from the French in June, Gaeta was recaptured at the end of July by royal troops and Pezza's men, aided by the British fleet. By late September the French had largely been driven out of the kingdom, and a Neapolitan army had gone on to liberate Rome. The Neapolitan insurrection had probably cost the lives of 50,000 or 60,000 people in the kingdom.

A hard, tough leader, Pezza gave no quarter. His men committed "most monstrous misdeeds", torturing and murdering hundreds of prisoners of war, including a French general. He was so ferocious that for a time Cardinal Ruffo placed him under arrest for his many atrocities. Nevertheless, for his services, Pezza was made a colonel in the army, ennobled as the Duke of Cassero, granted an annual pension of 2,500 ducats — making him one of the richest men in the district — and even given a lock of the queen's hair. He settled down near Itri with his wife, Fortunata Rachele Di Franco, a local beauty whom he had married in July 1799, when she was just 18, and he was en route to the liberation of Rome. For the next few years they lived quietly, while producing two sons.

=== Resistance to French rule 1806 ===
In 1806 Napoleon, Emperor of the French, decided to place his brother Joseph Bonaparte on the Neapolitan throne. Some 32,000 French troops invaded Naples in January, in three columns under General Laurent de Gouvion-Saint-Cyr, later a Marshal of France; about 12,000 men marched down the Adriatic coast, 15,000 more attacked down the Apennines, which form the spine of Italy, and General Jean Louis Reynier led about 10,000 troops down the Appian Way. The Neapolitan Army, with barely 13,000 men available for mobile operations, fell back on Calabria as the French quickly occupied frontier areas and pressed on. By February Reynier's column had captured Fondi and continued on towards Itri. Some Neapolitan troops were garrisoned at Pezza's old base, the Fortino di San Andrea,, but they fled south to Itri when the French turned up. The French pursued. There was a short skirmish at Itri, which hardly impeded the French advance. Reynier sent a regiment ahead to seize Gaeta by a coup de main, but the fortress, commanded by Louis, Landgrave of Hesse-Philippsthal, resisted stoutly. The Siege of Gaeta lasted until 18 July. The French found the rest of Naples easier prey. The capital fell on 14 February as the king and queen once more fled to Sicily, and the French soon overran most of the rest of the kingdom.

When the French invaded, Pezza was recalled to active duty, and ordered to organize a guerrilla column to resist the attackers. But the French moved so fast he was barely able to escape, and fled with his brothers to Sicily. He soon returned, however, and, on 23 March 1806, clashed with the French near Itri. Shortly afterwards, Pezza was recalled to Sicily to gather more forces, and in April joined an expedition to reinforce Gaeta that was led by the British admiral Sir Sidney Smith, one of Napoleon's most inveterate foes.

Hesse-Philippsthal gave Pezza command of a band of irregulars who were landed along the coast near the mouth of the Garigliano River, about 20 miles southeast of Gaeta, with instructions to stir up guerrilla resistance in the French rear. Pezza conducted several raids against French outposts, but then undertook an ill-advised attack against a substantial French force. Defeated, he fled back to Gaeta, assuming a disguise so as to trick a French officer into giving him a pass through the siege lines. To Hesse-Philippsthal this smacked of treachery, and he decided that Pezza was secretly in league with the French. Pezza was arrested and sent in chains to Palermo in May 1806. Sir Sidney quickly cleared Pezza's name, however, and for a few weeks he conducted seaborne raids against French outposts along the coast from Ponza and the other islands in the Gulf of Gaeta.

On 4 July, a small British and Sicilian force inflicted a stunning defeat on the French in the Battle of Maida, in Calabria. Hoping to follow up this victory, Pezza and a band of followers landed at Amante, in Calabria, on the 26th. Pezza proved to be the most effective of the many guerrilla leaders who had sprung up in the aftermath of the invasion, and soon attracted considerable local support. The French were soon closely invested at Cosenza. Given time the guerrillas might have taken the city. But Gaeta had fallen to the French on 18 July, after twelve days of heavy bombardment, during which Hesse-Phillipsthal had been gravely wounded. This released some 10,000 French troops, most of whom were promptly sent into Calabria. The various guerrilla leaders unwisely attempted to make a stand at Lauria. There, on 8 August, Marshal André Masséna defeated them, virtually annihilating their forces in a no quarter fight. Although on 14 August, with the support of Sir Sydney's ships, Pezza managed to capture Fort Licosa from the enemy, that very same day the French relieved Cosenza. As by this time enormously superior French forces were on the march, the British decided to withdraw their expedition; this withdrawal arguably prevented the Neapolitan insurgency from developing into an "ulcer" such as the Peninsular War in Spain beginning in 1808.

Despite the withdrawal of the British, for a time the guerrilla fighting in Calabria intensified. It was a horribly bloody affair, with the French often slaughtering whole villages, and the people massacring French prisoners. Surprisingly, Pezza proved far less ferocious than he had been in 1799. He even turned French prisoners over to the British in return for money and supplies, and once proved enormously courteous to the some French officers' wives whom he had captured. Nevertheless, the French posted a 50,000 ducat reward for anyone who killed or captured him, a sum equivalent to millions of dollars today.

=== Capture and death ===
Late in August 1806, Sir Sidney transferred Pezza and about 300 of his guerrillas by sea to the coast near Sperlonga, north of Gaeta. For a couple of weeks Pezza caused considerable trouble for the French, raiding local garrisons and ambushing convoys. On 5 September he ambushed and massacred a considerable French force near Itri. As a result, the French organized a "flying column", which pinned him down near Itri on the 28th. A hot battle resulted, but the French were able to storm his position from three different directions, resulting in the defeat of Pezza's band, which lost more than one hundred killed and about 60 taken prisoner, all of whom were immediately shot by the French. Pezza himself was reported dead, but survived.

With the remnants of his band, Pezza fled eastwards over the mountains. He was soon operating near Sora in the Abruzzi, with two thousand men and two cannon, having joined forces with other guerrilla leaders. A much stronger French force converged on his base. Pezza failed to retreat in time, and the French closed in on 24 October, storming his base camp. Most of his men were killed or captured, and Pezza was again initially thought to be dead, but he had escaped, though wounded; it was, however, to no avail. On 1 November, while at Baronissi, near Avellino, he was betrayed and captured in a pharmacy by French Corsican troops under the command of Major Joseph Léopold Sigisbert Hugo, father of the novelist Victor Hugo.

The French offered Pezza an enormous bribe if he would join them. When he refused, they tried him on charges of banditry, and sentenced him to death. The French spurned an offer by Queen Maria Carolina to exchange 200 French prisoners for him, and on 9 November they hanged him in the Piazza del Mercato at Naples, ostensibly for banditry.

Pezza's last words reportedly were "It pains me that I am condemned as a bandit and not a soldier".

Pezza's death did not end the insurrection against the French, as it was not until 1811 that widespread resistance came to an end, and there were still sporadic outbreaks as late as 1815. Over 33,000 suspected guerrillas were arrested during the fighting, and thousands – men, women, and children alike – were killed.

== Legacy ==
In addition to the works by Alexandre Dumas and Washington Irving, noted above, Pezza figures in a number of other artistic endeavors.

Daniel Auber's opera Fra Diavolo is founded on traditions associated with the legend, but has very little historical accuracy. Laurel and Hardy starred as "Stanlio" and "Ollio" in the 1933 feature film The Devil's Brother (sometimes titled as Fra Diavolo) based on Auber's opera.

There are several other films about Fra Diavolo, a complete listing of which may be found in the Italian Wikipedia site. The most important of these is Fra Diavolo, made in 1942 by Luigi Zampa and based on a play of the same name by Luigi Bonelli, later a prolific screenwriter. In the film, Pezza is a Robin Hood-like figure fighting the French.

The only Italian film about Pezza to be available in English is the 1964 Giovanni production, The Legend of Fra Diavolo, with an Italian cast, but starring Tony Russel, which was released in the US by Globe Films International. The film is rather more realistic than the Bonelli effort.

Paul Féval, père used the character of Fra Diavolo in his Les Habits Noirs book series. In it, Michele Bozzo (sic) is the nearly immortal Colonel Bozzo-Corana, feared leader of an international criminal brotherhood.

Fra diavolo sauce is believed to be named after Pezza.

== See also ==
- Siege of Amantea
