= Girolamo Magnesi =

Bishop

Most Reverend Girolamo Magnesi
- Bishop of Potenza
- Church: Catholic Church
- Diocese: Diocese of Potenza
- In office: 1634–1644
- Predecessor: Diego Vargas
- Successor: Miguel de Torres

Orders
- Consecration: 30 November 1634 by Carlo Emanuele Pio di Savoia

Personal details
- Died: 1644 Potenza, Italy

Girolamo Magnesi (died 1644) was a Roman Catholic prelate who served as Bishop of Potenza (1634–1644).

== Biography ==
On 7 July 1634, Girolamo Magnesi was selected as Bishop of Potenza and confirmed by Pope Urban VIII on 20 November 1634. On 30 November 1634, he was consecrated bishop by Carlo Emanuele Pio di Savoia, Cardinal-Bishop of Porto e Santa Rufina, with Giovanni Battista Altieri, Bishop Emeritus of Camerino, and Girolamo Parisani, Bishop of Polignano, serving as co-consecrators. He served as Bishop of Potenza until his death in 1644.

== External links and additional sources ==
- Cheney, David M. "Archdiocese of Potenza-Muro Lucano-Marsico Nuovo". Catholic-Hierarchy.org. (for Chronology of Bishops) ^{[self-published]}
- Chow, Gabriel. "Metropolitan Archdiocese of Potenza–Muro Lucano–Marsico Nuovo (Italy)". GCatholic.org. (for Chronology of Bishops) ^{[self-published]}

Catholic Church titles
Preceded by Diego Vargas	Bishop of Potenza; 1634–1644	Succeeded by Miguel de Torres
