= Bonaventura Claverio =

17th-century Roman Catholic prelate

Most Reverend Bonaventura Claverio
- Bishop of Potenza
- Church: Catholic Church
- Diocese: Diocese of Potenza
- In office: 1646–1671
- Predecessor: Miguel de Torres
- Successor: Diego Lozano González

Orders
- Consecration: 30 November 1634 by Carlo Emanuele Pio di Savoia

Personal details
- Born: 1606 Vigevano, Italy
- Died: 1671 (age 65) Potenza, Italy

Bonaventura Claverio (1606–1671) was a Roman Catholic prelate who served as Bishop of Potenza (1646–1671).

== Life ==
He was born in Vigevano, Italy, and ordained a friar in the Order of Friars Minor Conventual. On 8 May 1646, he was selected as Bishop of Potenza and confirmed by Pope Urban VIII on 16 July 1646. On 22 July 1646, he was consecrated bishop by Marcello Lante della Rovere, Cardinal-Bishop of Ostia, with Alphonse Sacrati, Bishop Emeritus of Comacchio, and Ranuccio Scotti Douglas, Bishop of Borgo San Donnino, serving as co-consecrators. He served as Bishop of Potenza until his death in 1671.

== External links and additional sources ==
- Cheney, David M. "Archdiocese of Potenza-Muro Lucano-Marsico Nuovo". Catholic-Hierarchy.org. (for Chronology of Bishops) ^{[self-published]}
- Chow, Gabriel. "Metropolitan Archdiocese of Potenza–Muro Lucano–Marsico Nuovo (Italy)". GCatholic.org. (for Chronology of Bishops) ^{[self-published]}

Catholic Church titles
| Preceded by Miguel de Torres | Bishop of Potenza; 1646–1671 | Succeeded by Diego Lozano González |
