= Miguel de Torres =

Most Reverend Miguel de Torres
- Bishop of Potenza
- Church: Catholic Church
- Diocese: Diocese of Potenza
- In office: 1644–1645
- Predecessor: Girolamo Magnesi
- Successor: Bonaventura Claverio

Personal details
- Born: 1593 Naples, Italy
- Died: 1645 (aged 51–52) Potenza, Italy

Miguel de Torres (1593 – 1645) was a Roman Catholic prelate who served as Bishop of Potenza (1644–1645).

== Biography ==
Miguel de Torres was born in Naples, Italy and ordained a priest in the Order of Preachers. On 3 January 1644, he was selected as Bishop of Potenza and confirmed by Pope Urban VIII on 18 April 1644. He served as Bishop of Potenza until his death in 1645.

== External links and additional sources ==
- Cheney, David M. "Archdiocese of Potenza-Muro Lucano-Marsico Nuovo". Catholic-Hierarchy.org. (for Chronology of Bishops) ^{[self-published]}
- Chow, Gabriel. "Metropolitan Archdiocese of Potenza–Muro Lucano–Marsico Nuovo (Italy)". GCatholic.org. (for Chronology of Bishops) ^{[self-published]}

Catholic Church titles
Preceded by Girolamo Magnesi	Bishop of Potenza; 1644–1645	Succeeded by Bonaventura Claverio
