= Il canto dei Sanfedisti =

1799 Italian counterrevolutionary song

"Il canto dei Sanfedisti" (transl. Song of the Sanfedisti) is a religious and patriotic hymn of the Sanfedisti, a counter-revolutionary movement in Italy in 1799 that fought against the Neapolitan Republic and revolutionary France.

== History ==
The lyrics of the song exalt the Catholic faith and the monarchy, opposing the atheism and anti-clericalism of the French revolutionaries. The melody has been attributed to Neapolitan musician Giuseppe Giordani. The attribution of "Il canto dei Sanfedisti" to Giordani stems from the testimony of Luigi Picchianti, a 19th-century Florentine music critic and historian. In a 1866 article published in the journal Archivio Storico Italiano, he wrote that Giordani composed the song's music during the repression of the Neapolitan Republic by Sanfedisti troops. However, some recent sources have debated the accuracy of this attribution; no contemporary documents exist to confirm Giordani's authorship. The song's lyrics were written by various unidentified authors and later adapted to Giordani's melody.

"Il canto dei Sanfedisti" was sung during the battles fought by the Sanfedisti against Napoleonic and revolutionary forces, becoming a symbol of resistance and defence of the Catholic monarchic tradition.

The song was revived in the 20th century by numerous popular musical groups (including the Nuova Compagnia di Canto Popolare), which contains an ironic reference to the Carmagnole (a French revolutionary song). The success attained by Santa Fede demonstrates that revolutionary and Jacobin ideas had only been adopted by among the most educated strata of the Neapolitan population.

== Lyrics ==
«A lu suono de grancasce
viva lu populo vascio,
a lu suono de tammurielle
so' risuorte li puverielle.

A lu suono de campane
viva, viva li pupulane,
a lu suono de viulini
morte a li giacubbine!

Sona, sona
sona Carmagnola
sona li cunziglie
viva 'o rre cu la famiglia.

A Sant'Eremo tanto forte
l'hanno fatto comm'â ricotta,
a 'stu curnuto sbrevognato
l'hanno miso 'a mitria 'ncapa.

Maistà, chi t'ha traduto?
Chistu stommaco chi ha avuto?
'E signure, 'e cavaliere
te vulevano priggiuniero.

Sona, sona
sona Carmagnola
sona li cunziglie
viva 'o rre cu la famiglia.

Alli tridece de giugno
sant'Antonio gluriuso
'e signure, 'sti birbante
'e facettero 'o mazzo tanto.

So' venute li francise
aute tasse n'c'hanno miso,
liberté, egalité
tu arruobbe a mme
io arruobbo a tte!

Sona, sona
sona Carmagnola
sona li cunsiglie
viva 'o rre cu la famiglia.

Li francise so' arrivate
c'hanno bbuono carusate,
et voilà, et voilà
cavece 'nculo a la libbertà!

A lu ponte d''a Maddalena
'onna Luisa è asciuta prena
e tre miedece che banno
nu' la ponno fà sgravà.

Sona, sona
sona Carmagnola
sona li cunziglie
viva 'o rre cu la famiglia.

A lu muolo senza 'uerra
se tiraje l'albero 'n terra
afferraino 'e giacubbine
'e facettero na mappina.

È fernuta l'uguaglianza
è fernuta la libbertà
pe vuje so' dulure 'e panza
signò, jateve a cuccà!

Sona, sona
sona Carmagnola
sona li cunsiglie
viva 'o rre cu la famiglia.

Passaje lu mese chiuvuso
lu ventuso e l'addiruso
a lu mese ca se mete
hanno avuto l'aglio arreto.

Viva Tata Maccarone
ca rispetta la religgione,
giacubbine jate a mare
che v'abbrucia lu panaro!

Sona, sona
sona Carmagnola
sona li cunziglie
viva 'o rre cu la famiglia.»

Translation:

«At the sound of bass drums
Hail to the common people,
At the sound of the tambourines
The poor have risen up.

At the sound of bells
Long live the peasantry,
At the sound of violins
Death to Jacobins.

Sing, sing
Sing the Carmagnole
Advisers are singing
Long live the King and his family.

At Sant’Eremo, so strong
They made him like ricotta,
This horned, shameless man
They put the mitre on his head.

Your Majesty, who betrayed you?
Who had this stomach?
The lord and the knight
wanted you to be their prisoner.

Sing, sing
Sing the Carmagnole
Advisers are singing
Long live the King and his family.

On the 13th of June,
Saint Anthony the Glorious,
These rascals,
Busted the lords asses!

The French have come,
And imposed new taxes on us,
"Liberté, Égalité"
You rob me
I rob you.

Sing, sing
Sing the Carmagnole
Advisers are singing
Long live the King and his family.

The French have arrived
And already bled us dry
And voilà, and voilà
Kick liberty in the ass.

At the Maddalena Bridge,
Mrs. Luisa is dry, pregnant.
And three doctors go around,
Who cannot make her miscarry.

Sing, sing,
Sing the Carmagnole
Advisers are singing
Long live the King and his family.

At the dock, by the war's end,
They have downed liberty's mast,
They've caught the Jacobins,
And tore them like dirty rags.

It's the end of equality,
And it's the end of liberty,
For they have stomach aches now,
Gentlemen, go to bed!

Sing, sing
Sing the Carmagnole
Advisers are singing
Long live the King and his family.

The rainy month went by
Also the windy, and the irascible
And in the reaping month
They've discovered your fraud.

Long live Tata Maccarone
Who respects religion,
Jacobins to the sea
Your asses are burning.

Sing, sing
Sing the Carmagnole
Advisers are singing
Long live the King and his family»
