= Juan Ortega (bishop) =

Most Reverend Juan Ortega
- Bishop Elect of Potenza
- Church: Catholic Church
- Diocese: Diocese of Potenza
- In office: 1502–1503
- Successor: Jaime Serra i Cau

Personal details
- Died: 1503 Potenza, Italy

Juan Ortega (died 1503) was a Roman Catholic prelate who was appointed Bishop of Potenza in 1502.

== Biography ==
On 16 Nov 1502, Juan Ortega was appointed by Pope Alexander VI as Bishop of Potenza. It is uncertain if he ever took possession of the see. He died before he was consecrated bishop in 1503.

== External links and additional sources ==
- Cheney, David M. "Archdiocese of Potenza-Muro Lucano-Marsico Nuovo". Catholic-Hierarchy.org. (for Chronology of Bishops) ^{[self-published]}
- Chow, Gabriel. "Metropolitan Archdiocese of Potenza–Muro Lucano–Marsico Nuovo (Italy)". GCatholic.org. (for Chronology of Bishops) ^{[self-published]}

Catholic Church titles
Preceded by	Bishop of Potenza; 1502–1503	Succeeded by Jaime Serra i Cau
