= Jaume Serra i Cau =

Spanish cardinal

Jaume Serra i Cau (Valencian pronunciation: [ˈdʒawme ˈsɛra j ˈkaw], Spanish: Jaime Serra y Cau; died 1517) was a Spanish Valencian cardinal, from the city of Valencia. He was tutor to the young Giovanni Borgia, and a close associate of his father Pope Alexander VI.

He was archbishop of Oristano in 1492, and was created cardinal in 1500. He was bishop of Linköping in 1501, bishop of Elne in 1506. He was bishop of Albano in 1511, and possibly bishop of Palestrina in 1516 (sources disagree).

He was governor of Rome and Cesena

He was buried in San Giacomo degli Spagnoli, where a mortuary chapel was built for him.

== Notes ==
Catholic Church titles
Preceded by Ferdinando Romano	Archbishop of Oristano; 1492–1510	Succeeded by Pedro Serra Muñoz
Preceded by Raymond Pérault	Cardinal-Priest of San Vitale; 1500–1502	Succeeded by Giovanni Stefano Ferrero
Preceded by Henrik Tidemansson	Administrator of Linköping; 1501–1513	Succeeded by Johannes Petrus Brask
Preceded by Domenico della Rovere	Cardinal-Priest of San Clemente; 1502–1511	Succeeded by Francesco Argentino
Preceded by Juan Ortega	Bishop of Potenza; 1503–1506	Succeeded by Giacomo Nini
Preceded by Francisco Lloris y de Borja	Administrator of Elne; 1506–1513	Succeeded by Juan Castellanos de Villalba
Preceded by Philippe de Luxembourg	Cardinal-Bishop of Albano; 1511–1516	Succeeded by Francesco de Remolins
Preceded by Pascual Rebenga de Ampudia	Administrator of Burgos; 1512–1514	Succeeded by Juan Rodríguez de Fonseca
Preceded by Juan Fernández Velasco	Administrator of Calahorra y La Calzada; 1514–1515	Succeeded by Juan Castellanos de Villalba
Preceded by Marco Vigerio della Rovere	Cardinal-Bishop of Palestrina; 1516–1517	Succeeded by Francesco Soderini
