= Giovanni Andrea Serrao =

Italian catholic bishop

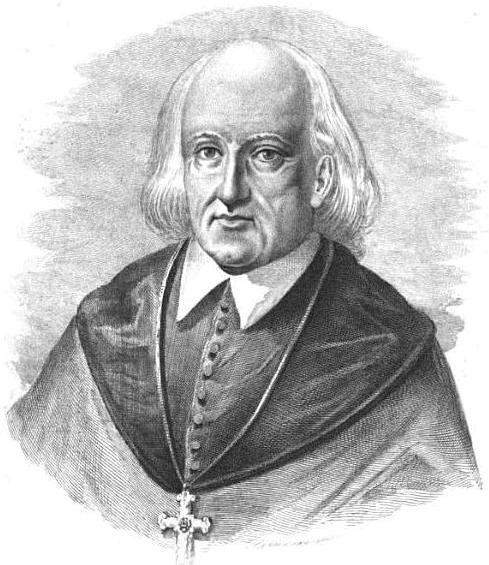
Giovanni Andrea Serrao

Giovanni Andrea Serrao (4 February 1731 – 24 February 1799) was an Italian intellectual and churchman of the Kingdom of Naples who supported the Parthenopaean Republic of 1799.

== Biography ==
=== Early life and ordination ===
Giovanni Andrea Serrao was born in Castel Monardo. Studying first in Castel Monardo, then in Naples, he became friends with Antonio Genovesi, Domenico Cirillo, Mario Pagano and Forges Davanzati. From 1758 to 1788 he wrote various works in Latin supporting the democratic concessions in the Papal States and opposing the Roman Curia. After a year of harsh polemics, he was nominated to be bishop of Potenza on 18 July 1783.

=== Earthquake ===
Finding himself in Rome waiting to take possession of his diocese, news reached him of the earthquake of 28 March 1783 which had (among others) destroyed all the centres of Calabria, his native land. Despite having been debilitated by a fall, he urged his brothers to abandon the old and destroyed site of Castel Monardo and found a new one at a place to be named piano della Gorna. Elaborating the plan for the new town, outlined by his brother Francescantonio, he arranged for a new Pubblico Sedile to be set up in the central piazza at his family's expense and suggested the name of Filadelfia for the new town (drawing the idea from king Ferdinand IV of Naples).

=== Parthenopaean Republic ===
Taking an active part in the Parthenopaean Republic of 1799, the most illustrious figures in the new state wished him to become Commissario Civile in Potenza. On 24 February 1799 he was murdered in Potenza by his own guard and his head carried through the streets of the town.

Giovanni Andrea Serrao is mentioned in Dumas' novel La Sanfelice.

== Sources ==
- Forges-Davanzati, Giovanni Andrea Serrao, Bari, Laterza, 1937
- Alexandre Dumas, La Sanfelice, Milano, Adelphi, 1999, due voll., ISBN 88-459-1433-X
