= Fra Diavolo (opera) =

Opera by Daniel Auber

- Opéra comique by Daniel Auber
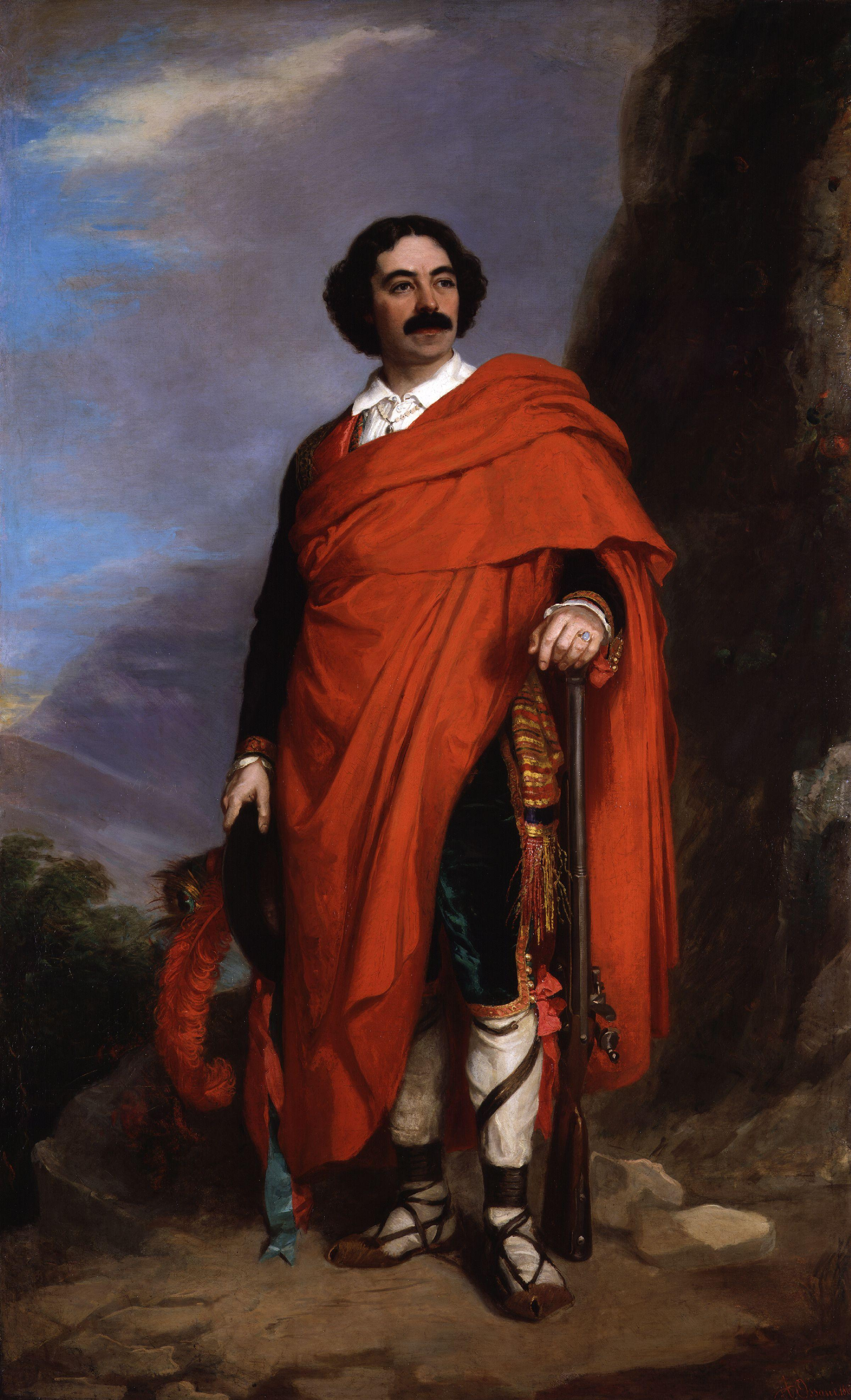
- John Sims Reeves in the title role
- Librettist: Eugène Scribe
- Language: French
- Premiere: 28 January 1830; Salle Ventadour, Paris

Fra Diavolo, ou L'hôtellerie de Terracine (Fra Diavolo, or The Inn of Terracina) is an opéra comique in three acts by the French composer Daniel Auber, from a libretto by Auber's regular collaborator Eugène Scribe. It is loosely based on the life of the Itrani guerrilla leader Michele Pezza, active in southern Italy in the period 1800-1806, who went under the name of Fra Diavolo ("Brother Devil"). Diavolo fought against the French, who occupied parts of Italy, pillaging different towns on his way. Once French occupation ended, Diavolo was pardoned. When Napoleon recaptured Naples, a price was put on Diavolo's head and he was hanged in the public marketplace. He is now celebrated in Italian folk legends and through works like this opera.

The opera was first performed by the Opéra-Comique at the Salle Ventadour in Paris on 28 January 1830 and an Italian version was prepared by Auber and Scribe for performance in London in 1857. This contained new recitatives and arias, as well as expanding the roles of Fra Diavolo's accomplices.

The opera was Auber's greatest success, one of the most popular works of the 19th century, and was in the standard repertory in its original French as well as German and Italian versions. An English translation was also prepared. Hugh Macdonald has characterised this comic opera as "the most successful work of its kind before Offenbach."

== Roles ==
Role	Voice type	Premiere Cast, 28 January 1830 (Conductor: - )
Fra Diavolo, a bandit	tenor	Jean-Baptiste Chollet
Zerline, daughter of Mathéo	soprano	Geneviève-Aimé-Zoë Prévost
Lord Cockburn, an English traveller	baritone	Féréol
Lady Pamela, his wife	mezzo-soprano	Marie-Julie Halligner ("Mme Boulanger")
Lorenzo, an officer of the guards	tenor	Moreau-Cinti
Giacomo, Fra Diavolo's accomplice	bass	Fargueil
Beppo, Fra Diavolo's accomplice	tenor	Belnie
Mathéo, an innkeeper	bass	François-Louis Henry ("Henri")
A Peasant	tenor	
A Soldier	tenor	
Francesco, the richest man in five miles	mute	
Jean-Jacques, Lord Cockburn's servant	mute or chorus	
John, Matheo's servant	mute or chorus	

== Synopsis ==
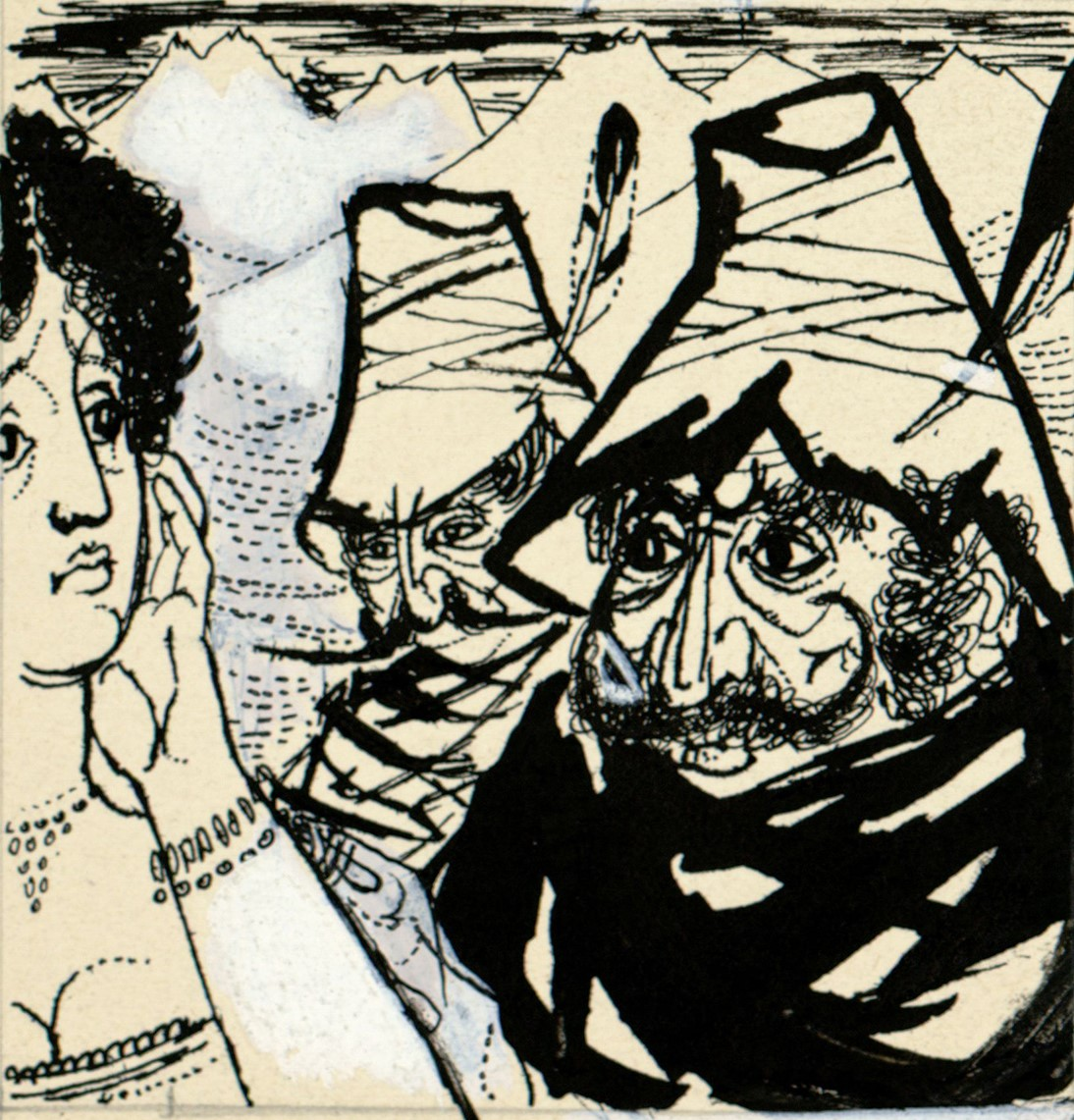
Cover design by Peter Hoffer (undated) for the libretto, published by Ricordi

Zerline, daughter of the innkeeper of Terracina, is in love with an impoverished soldier, Lorenzo, but her father wants her to marry the rich old Francesco. Lorenzo is in pursuit of the notorious bandit Fra Diavolo. Diavolo himself arrives at the inn disguised as a marquis and robs two English travellers, Lord and Lady Cockburn. Lorenzo manages to retrieve part of the stolen goods and is rewarded with enough money to marry Zerline. Diavolo is determined to rob the travellers again and enlists the help of his two comical henchmen, Giacomo and Beppo. During the night the three of them sneak into Zerline's room and steal her dowry. Lorenzo appears and mistakes the 'marquis' for a rival in love. The next day Zerline is forced to marry Francesco as she now no longer has her dowry. Diavolo instructs his henchmen to warn him when Lorenzo and his troop of soldiers have left the town so he can safely rob again, but the two are recognised in the crowd by Zerline and Diavolo is tricked into appearing and arrested when the signal is given as arranged. Zerline is free to marry Lorenzo again.

== Recordings ==
- Urania URLP-204: Hans Hopf (Fra Diavolo), Irma Beilke (Zerline), Marie Louise Schlip (Lady Pamela), Gottlob Frick (Matheo), Arno Schellenberg (Milord); Chorus of the Dresden State Opera; Staatskapelle Dresden; Karl Elmendorff, conductor (1944, in German)
- Polydor: Giuseppe Campora (Fra Diavolo), Cecilia Fusco (Zerlina), Margaret Simoncini (Lady Pamela), Vito Susca (Matteo), Marco Stecchi (Milord); Chorus and Orchestra of the Teatro Giuseppe Verdi, Trieste, Arturo Basile conductor, (1968, in Italian)
- Fonit Cetra: Dano Raffanti (Fra Diavolo), Luciana Serra (Zerlina), Martine Dupuy (Lady Pamela), Giorgio Tadeo (Matteo), Nelson Portella (Milord); Cambridge University Chamber Choir, Orchestra del Festival di Martina Franca, Alberto Zedda, conductor (1981, in Italian)
- EMI Classics: Nicolai Gedda (Fra Diavolo), Mady Mesplé (Zerline), Jane Berbié (Lady Pamela), Jules Bastin (Mathéo), Rémi Corazza (Milord), Ensemble Choral Jean Laforge, Monte-Carlo Philharmonic Orchestra; Marc Soustrot, conductor (1984, in French)

== Film ==
Expanding and renaming the roles of Beppo and Giacomo, respectively, Laurel and Hardy starred as "Stanlio" and "Ollio" in the 1933 feature film Fra Diavolo (sometimes titled as The Devil's Brother or Bogus Bandits) based on Auber's opera. There is not a great deal of singing in the film. Much of the chorus material is intact, and Diavolo has three numbers; however, Zerline gets to sing only the small bit necessary to the plot (singing when she undresses), Stanlio and Ollio only repeat songs heard by others, and no one else sings.
