= Fabrizio Ruffo =

Italian cardinal and politician (1744–1827)

His Eminence Fabrizio Dionigi Ruffo
- Cardinal-Deacon of Santa Maria in Via Lata
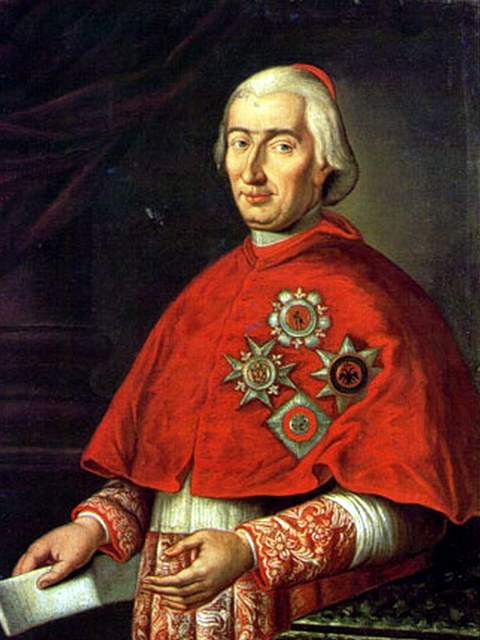
- Other posts: Treasurer of the Apostolic Chamber (1785–1794) Cardinal-Deacon of Sant'Angelo in Pescheria (1794–1800); Cardinal-Deacon of Santa Maria in Cosmedin (1800–1821) Grand Prior of Rome in the Sovereign Military Order of Malta (1817–1827)

Orders
- Created cardinal: 26 September 1791 by Pope Pius VI
- Rank: Cardinal deacon

Personal details
- Born: Fabrizio Dionigi Ruffo dei duchi di Bagnara e Baranello; 16 September 1744 San Lucido, Calabria, Kingdom of Naples
- Died: 13 December 1827 (aged 83) Naples, Kingdom of the Two Sicilies
- Denomination: Roman Catholicism
- Coat of arms

Fabrizio Dionigi Ruffo (16 September 1744 – 13 December 1827) was an Italian cardinal and politician, who led the popular anti-Jacobin Sanfedismo movement (whose members were known as the Sanfedisti).

== Biography ==
Ruffo was born at San Lucido, in Calabria Citra (today in province of Cosenza), then part of the Kingdom of Naples. His father, Litterio Ruffo, was a Calabrian aristocrat, holder of the title of duke of Baranello, while his mother, Giustiniana, was of the Roman family of Colonna. Fabrizio owed his education to his uncle, cardinal Tommaso Ruffo, then dean of the College of Cardinals. In early life he secured the favour of Giovanni Angelo Braschi, who in 1775 became Pope Pius VI. Ruffo was placed by the pope among the chierici di camera, the clerks who formed the papal civil and financial service. He was later promoted to treasurer-general, a post which carried with it the ministry of war. Ruffo's conduct in office was diversely judged. Pietro Colletta, the historian of Naples, speaks of him as corrupt, and Jomini repeats the charge, but these can be dismissed as part of a hostile tradition, as they both participated in favour of France. In fact, he was widely regarded as a reformer.

Ruffo's biographer, Sachinelli, says that he incurred hostility by restricting the feudal powers of some of the landowners in the Papal States. In 1791 he was removed from the treasurership, but was created cardinal on 2 September, though he was not in orders and in fact never became a priest. Ruffo went to Naples, where he was named administrator of the royal domain of Caserta, and received the abbey of Santa Sofia, Benevento in commendam.

On account of the equity of his fiscal norms he made an enemy of the Roman aristocracy, which put pressure upon the Pontiff. In 1791, Pope Pius VI removed Mgr. Ruffo from his office and offered to create him a cardinal (according to the traditional Latin proverb promoveatur ut amoveatur). On 21 February 1794 Ruffo was created cardinal of the Roman deaconry of Sant'Angelo in Pescheria and charged with the administration of the Ager Romanus.

He also announced Pope Leo XII's election in the papal conclave of 1823.

=== Sanfedismo ===
When in December 1798 the French troops advanced on Naples, Ruffo fled to Palermo with the royal family. He was chosen to head a royalist movement in Calabria, where his family, though impoverished by debt, exercised large feudal powers. After having received the title of King's General Official, Ruffo weighed anchor from Palermo and landed in Calabria on February 8, and began to raise the so-called "army of the faith" in association with Michele Pezza, "Fra Diavolo", and other brigand leaders. His feuds of Scilla and Bagnara were the first places to be used for a massive enlistment of 25,000 farmers skilled to arms. They formed the Christian and Real Army, also known as Esercito della Santa Fede in Nostro Signore Gesù Cristo, and conquered Crotone moving to the Basilicata and Apulia regions (Altamura and Modugno), and finally in the Principato Ultra. At the head of his army, cardinal Ruffo participated to the battles of the Second anti-French Coalition which defeated Naples on 15 June 1799. Ruffo appointed the member of the State juncta that processed the rebels for the crime of Lèse-majesté.

Backed by the Russian fleet of Admiral Ushakov, Ruffo had no difficulty in upsetting the Parthenopean Republican government established by the French, and by June had advanced to Naples. Possibly exceeding his authority, he promised the Neapolitan republicans immunity from reprisals and obtained their surrender in June 1799. In the meantime Rear-Admiral Horatio Nelson, sent from Palermo by King Ferdinand, appeared in the Bay of Naples with his fleet; he called the cardinal to task for his leniency, and revoked the terms of surrender. The republicans, it was asserted, had surrendered under terms that were unclear. One of the main republican figures, former Admiral Francesco Caracciolo, was ignominiously executed on 30 June, and widespread reprisals and executions of other republican sympathizers in Naples followed.

While Ruffo was a personal confidant of the king of Naples, the queen preferred the admiral Horatio Nelson to him. On 24 June Ruffo arrived in the roadstead. The following day, when the first Jacobins were waiting to be boarded, the English admiral informed that the pact of pacification partially enacted by the cardinal, was "infamous" and that he would never allow its execution. Eventually, an English official decided the destiny of the Neapolitan prisoners: they were entrusted to Bourbon justice and 124 of them were put to death.

The campaign gave rise to much controversy among nineteenth-century historians. Ruffo appears to have lost favor with the king by showing a tendency to spare the republicans. He resigned the vicar-generalship, which he had been granted on 25 January 1800, to the prince of Cassero, and during the second French occupation and the reigns of Joseph Bonaparte and Joachim Murat he lived quietly in Naples. Some notice was taken of him by Napoleon, but he never held an important post. After the restoration of the Bourbons he was received into favor. During the revolutionary troubles of 1822 he was consulted by the king, and was even in office for a very short time as a loyalist minister.

== Return to the Holy See and role in the Kingdom of Naples ==
After the conquest of Naples, Ruffo decided to send some military companies within the Roman Republic, led by the general Gian Battista Rodio. This represented the first act of invasion of the Republican State. After the defeat of the Roman Republic, on 11 August 1800 Ruffo entered in the Urbe and changed his cardinal diacony with the one of Santa Maria in Cosmedin. In 1801, after having been resigned from the role of general vicarious of the king of Naples, for a short time he filled the role of minister of Naples in Rome and then accepted the government of Joseph Bonaparte in the Neapolitan territory. In September 1805, he escaped in Amelia, Umbria, and then he was hoised for a second time by Ferdinand I of the Two Sicilies and his court in Palermo, who appointed him as ambassador at the Parisian court. On 2 April 1810 Ruffo was present at his marriage with the duchess Marie Louise of Austria. After this gesture, he become part of the so-called "red cardinals", a restricted circle of high prelates who weren't punished by the French emperor and got the right to continue to publicly profess their religious functions. The emperor instituted a commission with the duty to formulate a brief indicating the conclusive decrees of the Council of Paris which was held in 1811. It was formed by Ruffo, Giuseppe Doria Pamphili and Aurelio Roverella. The main objective was to persuade Pope Pius VII, who was jailed in Savona, to counterfirm the act. It was a favour to the French emperor, who decorated him with the Cross of the Legion of Honour.

In May 1814, Ruffo returned to Rome where the population and the College of Cardinals received him with indifference, so that he decided to move to Naples and to establish himself there. On 8 February 1815 Pope Pius VII recalled Ruffo to Rome and appointed him Prefect of the Annona and of Grascia, a role responsible for the procurement of meat, fat, and oil. On 8 May 1817 he become Great Prior of the Order of Malta within the Pontifical State. From 29 March 1819 to 21 February 1820, he was Camerlengo of the Holy Roman Church until his appointment in the Prefect of the Congregation for Water, Pontine Marshes and of Chiani. In March 1821, he came back to Naples, which was afflicted by the popular rebellion against the Austrian military forces. On 27 June he chose the diacony of Santa Maria in Via Lata and held the title of Cardinal Protodeacon. In August 1823, Ruffo took part in the papal conclave which elected Pope Leo XII. At the end of the year, Ruffo went back to Naples.

He died in Naples on 13 December 1827 and was buried in his familiar chapel, consecrated to Saint Catherine of Alexandria, within the San Domenico Maggiore Basilica, not distant from the Aquinos' chapel.

== See also ==
- Kingdom of Naples
- Parthenopean Republic
- Domenico Sacchinelli
