= The Devil's Brother =

1933 American film by Hal Roach

- theatrical poster
- Directed by: Hal Roach; Charles Rogers
- Written by: Eugène Scribe (libretto); Jeanie MacPherson (adaptation)
- Based on: Fra Diavolo; 1830 opera by Auber
- Produced by: Hal Roach
- Starring: Stan Laurel; Oliver Hardy; Dennis King
- Cinematography: Hap Depew; Art Lloyd
- Edited by: Bert Jordan; William H. Terhune
- Music by: Auber; Leroy Shield
- Production companies: Hal Roach Studios; Metro-Goldwyn-Mayer
- Distributed by: Loew's, Inc.
- Release date: May 5, 1933
- Running time: 90 mins
- Country: United States
- Language: English

The Devil's Brother (or Bogus Bandits as an Astor Pictures reissue title) or Fra Diavolo outside the U.S. is a 1933 American Pre-Code musical comedy film starring Laurel and Hardy. It is based on Daniel Auber's operetta Fra Diavolo about the Italian bandit Fra Diavolo.

== Plot ==
In the early 18th century, the notorious bandit Fra Diavolo regales his compatriots at their encampment in Northern Italy with an account of his recent encounter with the aristocratic couple Lord Rocburg and Lady Pamela. Assuming the guise of the Marquis de San Marco, Diavolo ingratiates himself with the duo during a carriage ride, coaxing Lady Pamela to divulge the whereabouts of her coveted jewels. Subsequently, he dispatches his cohorts to pillage Rocburg's estate and abscond with Pamela's treasures. Concurrently, two hapless individuals, Stanlio and Ollio, after falling victim to a robbery themselves, entertain the notion of adopting a life of banditry.

Their ill-fated endeavor to emulate Diavolo's exploits leads them into a farcical confrontation with the formidable outlaw. Diavolo, suspecting Stanlio of impersonating him, orders his execution, only to be interrupted by news that his henchmen have secured Pamela's jewels but failed to locate Rocburg's concealed fortune. Undeterred, Diavolo, once again assuming the identity of the marquis, enlists Stanlio and Ollio as his attendants, plotting to seize Rocburg's wealth at an inn where he resumes his amorous pursuit of Lady Pamela.

However, their scheme is disrupted when Stanlio inadvertently imbibes a soporific intended for Rocburg, thwarting Diavolo's efforts to locate Rocburg's hidden riches. Amidst the ensuing chaos, Stanlio inadvertently exposes Diavolo's machinations to Captain Lorenzo, who resolves to clear his own name of a theft attributed to him by Diavolo. As Lorenzo confronts Diavolo, aided inadvertently by Stanlio, a confrontation ensues, culminating in Diavolo's defeat and the restoration of Pamela's jewels.

In a gesture of redemption, Diavolo relinquishes the ill-gotten gains to Lorenzo, facilitating the latter's benevolent intervention to preserve Matteo's inn from financial ruin. The narrative climaxes with Diavolo and his cohorts facing the prospect of execution, only to be spared by a fortuitous intervention involving a perturbed bull. Subsequently, amidst the ensuing chaos, Diavolo seizes the opportunity to evade capture by galloping away on a horse, while Stanlio and Ollio, propelled by serendipity, effect their own improbable escape by clinging on the back of the enraged bull as it charges off into the countryside. Through a series of further farcical hi-jinks, it is revealed that the hidden money-purse had been sewn into Lady Pamela's petticoats, and thus it could have easily been stolen by Diavolo --- had he known it was there --- on any of several occasions when he'd been in close proximity to Pamela.

== Cast ==
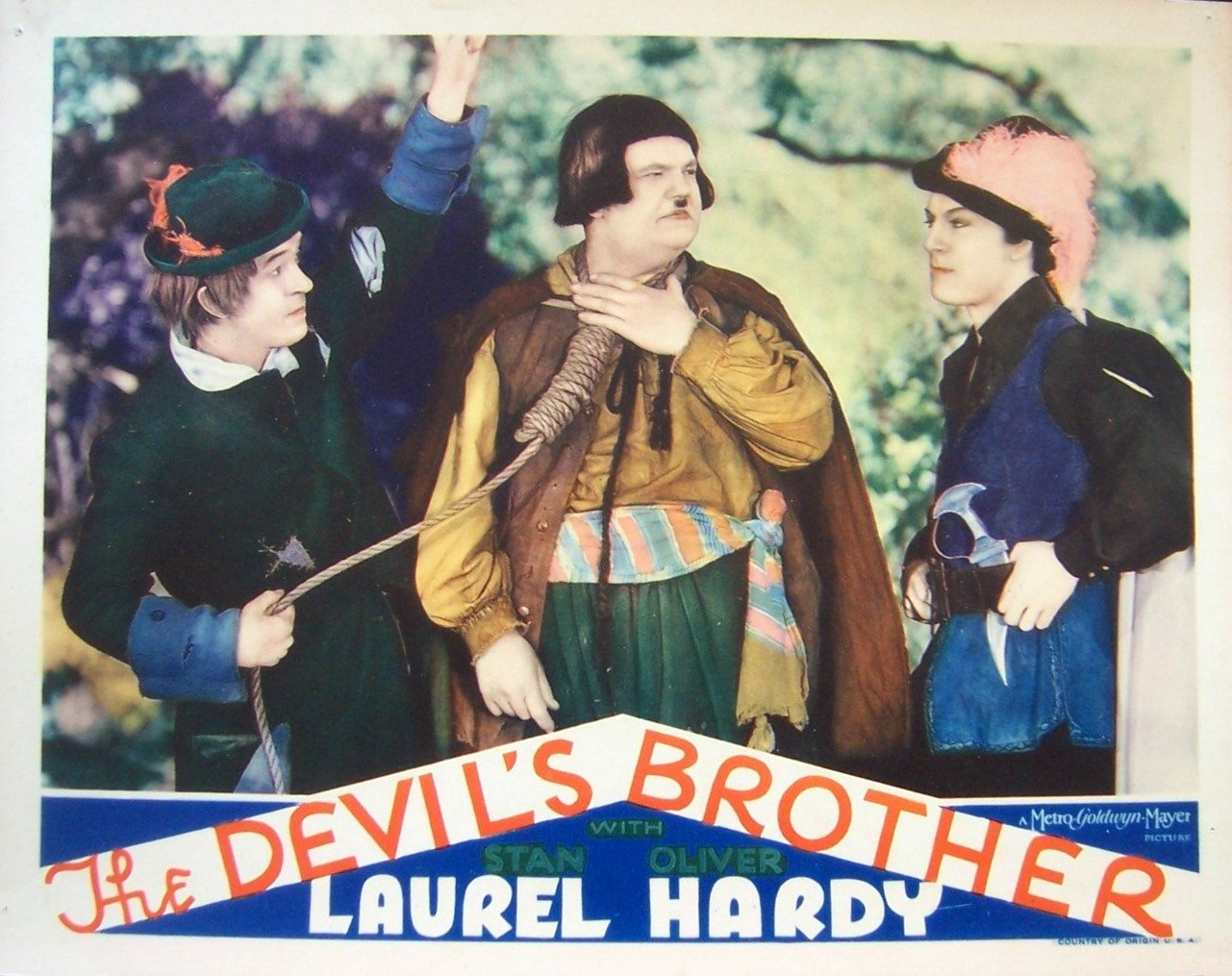
Lobby card

- Stan Laurel as Stanlio
- Oliver Hardy as Ollio
- Dennis King as Fra Diavolo/Marquis de San Marco
- Thelma Todd as Lady Pamela
- James Finlayson as Lord Rocburg
- Lucile Browne as Zerlina
- Arthur Pierson as Lorenzo
- Henry Armetta as Matteo The Innkeeper
- Matt McHugh as Francesco
- Lane Chandler as Lieutenant
- Nina Quartero as Rita
- Wilfred Lucas as Alessandro
- James C. Morton as The Old Woodchopper
- John Qualen as Man Who Owned Bull (uncredited)
- Arthur Stone as Brigand (uncredited)
- Leo White as Tavern Patron (uncredited)

=== Kneesy-Earsy-Nosey ===
Kneesy-Earsy-Nosey was the game of coordination and dexterity played by Stanlio in the picture, to Ollio's great frustration. The game, which became a fad shortly after the film's release, consists of clapping the knees, then grabbing one ear with the opposite hand while grabbing the nose with the other hand, again clapping the knees, and then grabbing the other ear with the opposite hand while grabbing the nose with the other hand. Participants attempt to do it with increasing speed. Once coordination has been achieved, one can become extremely fast, and proficiency can be regained even after years of hiatus.

Both "Kneesy-Earsy-Nosey" and "Finger Wiggle"—another game Stan plays in Fra Diavolo—make a brief appearance in Babes in Toyland (1934) when Oliver Hardy's character (Ollie Dee) tells Stanley's character (Stannie Dum), in relation to hitting a PeeWee, "If you can do it, I can do it." Stannie then performs both games to disprove Ollie's maxim.

== Reception ==
Leonard Maltin gave the film three of four stars: "Destitute Stan and Ollie become bungling henchmen for notorious singing bandit ... One of the comedy team's best features." Leslie Halliwell wrote, "Auber's 1830 operetta becomes a vehicle for Laurel and Hardy ... They have excellent sequences, but overall the film lacks pace."
