= Nicola Serena di Lapigio =

Italian writer and journalist

- Born: May 22, 1875; Altamura, Italy
- Died: March 6, 1938; Rome, Italy
- Citizenship: Italian
- Education: Rome
- Occupations: Writer, journalist
- Writing career
- Language: Italian
- Notable work: Panorami garganici

Nicola Serena di Lapigio (22 May 1875 - 6 March 1938) was an Italian nobleman, writer and journalist.

== Life ==
His father was baron Ottavio Serena, a historian and politician of the early years of the Kingdom of Italy, while his mother was Maria Priore. In his youth, he studied law in Rome and, after graduation, he went to war, serving as Ufficiale di artiglieria during World War I, until he was appointed Segretario con funzioni di Capo-gabinetto del Sottosegretario di Stato inside the Italian ministry Ministero Approvvigionamenti e Consumi. From February 1921 to February 1926, he was part of the Inter-Allied Commission for War Reparations in Bulgaria (Commissione Interalleata per le riparazioni bulgare), and in this period he lived in Sofia; there he was promoted to Capo Servizio, Segretario Generale, Delegato d'Italia and Presidente della Commissione. In the last years of his life, he returned to Italy, where he died on 6 March 1938 at the age of 63.

== Works ==
Nicola Serena di Lapigio wrote articles for many Italian and local newspapers, namely Tribuna, Rassegna Nazionale, Le Vie d'Italia and Rassegna Pugliese, where he was appointed co-director from 1909 to 1913. On the pages of this last newspaper, he published literary essays and reviews.

In 1907, he published his work Cesaria (B. Lux, Roma), followed in 1909 by the collection of novels Piccole anime e piccole cose, printed in Milan by poublisher Casa Editrice Cogliati; the preface was written by Antonio Fogazzaro. After a period of stagnation, his passion for writing appeared again in the 1930s, when he published a new collection of novels titled Vecchi racconti.

=== Panorami garganici ===
In 1934, he published what is probably his masterpiece, the collection of travel memoirs Panorami garganici, which comprised both new and already published novels. The book, divided into nine chapters and including many pictures of Italian region Gargano, contributed to raise awareness on this area, which was then practically uninhabited. Serena di Lapigio had a strong passion for Italian region Apulia (lo Sperone d'Italia), which he knew very well, from the Tremiti Islands, then a prison, to Monte Sant'Angelo, from the coast of San Menaio, to Foresta Umbra. In his writings, he merged his sensitivity to the nature of Gargano with the objectivity of the research of history. His prose is both elegant and clear.

== See also ==
- Gargano
- San Menaio
- Rodi Garganico
- Antonio Fogazzaro

== Sources ==
- Domenico Giusto, Dizionario Bio-Bibliografico degli Scrittori Pugliesi, S.E.T., Bari, s.d.
- Michele Vocino, Alla scoperta della Daunia con viaggiatori d'ogni tempo, Studio Editoriale Dauno, Foggia, 1957.
- Francesco Giuliani, Viaggi novecenteschi in terra di Puglia. Nicola Serena di Lapigio - Kazimiera Alberti - Cesare Brandi, Edizioni del Rosone, Foggia, 2009.
