= Epitaph of Altamura =

Monument in Altamura, Italy

- Epitaffio di Altamura (Italian)
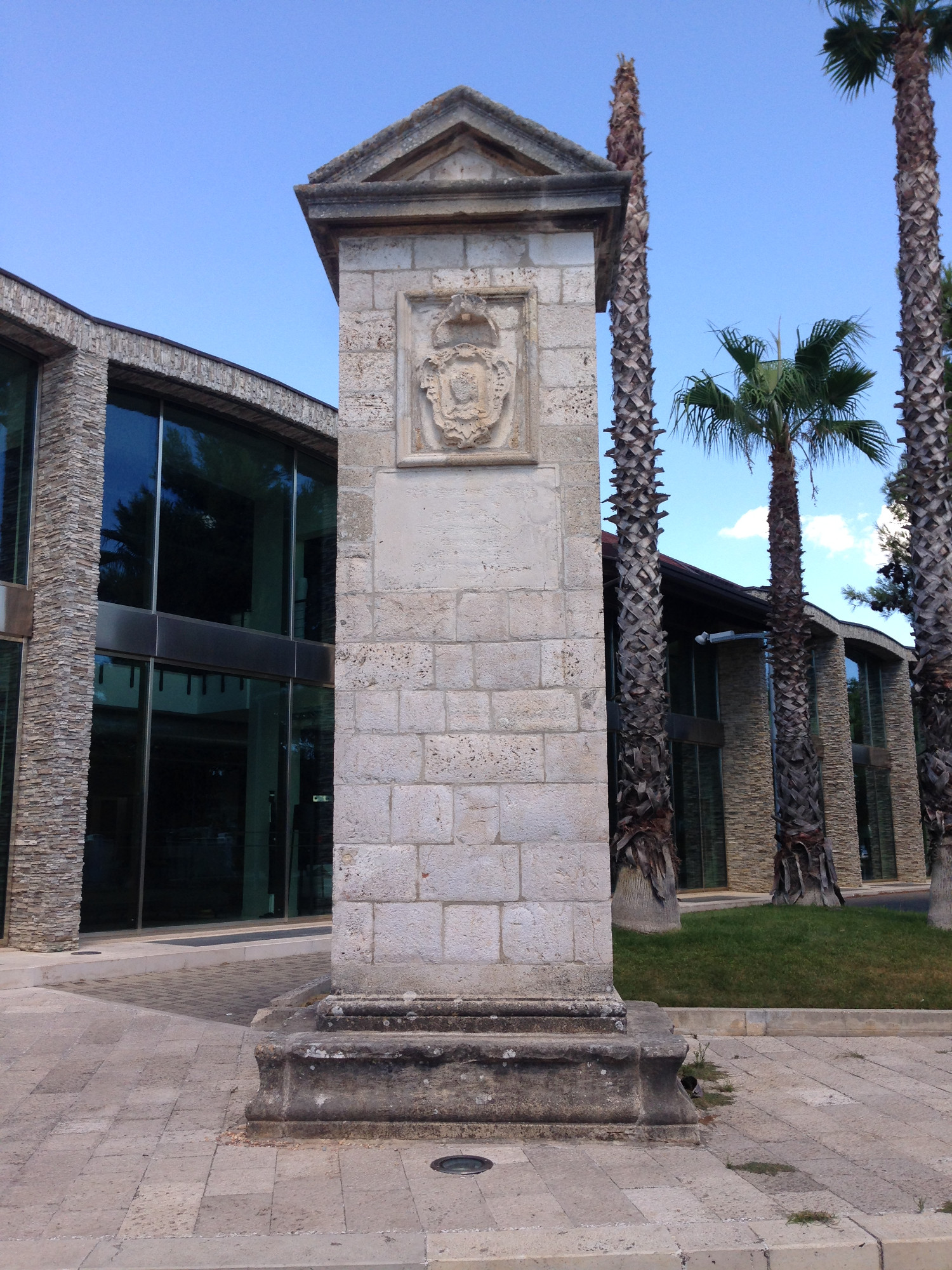
- Epitaph of Altamura
- Interactive map of Epitaph of Altamura
- 40.838425°N 16.550767°E
- Nearest city: Altamura

History
- Built: 1807 ca.

Site notes
- Height: C. 4 m

The Epitaph of Altamura (Italian: Epitaffio di Altamura) is a monument located in Altamura, Southern Italy. According to historian Ottavio Serena, it was erected right after the visit in city, on 8 April 1807, of Joseph Bonaparte (the elder brother of Napoleon Bonaparte), who had just become king of Naples. According to more recent hypotheses, this monument was instead built in the year 1797, right after the visit of the kings Ferdinand IV and Maria Carolina of Austria in the city of Altamura. The commemorative monument is located in largo Epitaffio (Epitaph square). Although traditionally named epitaph, it is not a funerary inscription but instead a commemorative monument.

== Ottavio Serena's hypothesis ==
According to Ottavio Serena, Joseph Bonaparte was coming from the city of Taranto. He was returning to Naples, from where he had departed on 21 March of the same year. The representatives of the city of Altamura and a multitude of people went to meet and warmly welcomed Joseph Bonaparte, who stopped to greet the people in the square that was named largo Epitaffio. Joseph Bonaparte stayed in Altamura in the palace of count Viti, he received the hereditary title "Prince of Altamura" and then left. On 9 April the king was in Venosa, and on 12 April he was already back in Naples.

== Michele Marvulli's hypothesis ==
According to more recent studies by the scholar Michele Marvulli (1996), this monument dates back to the year 1797, when the kings of the Kingdom of Naples Ferdinand IV and Maria Carolina of Austria visited the city of Altamura, as testified by a few sources. In support of this, Vitangelo Bisceglia's chronicles (unknown to Ottavio Serena) state that in 1799 the "royal army" placed two years earlier on the occasion of the visit of the kings was destroyed in the San Martino district (i.e. the area where the monument is located): Another point in support of this is that in Michele Rotunno's chronicle (relating to the events of 1799 to Altamura) the monument is cited in order to indicate the direction in which the fugitives were headed in the year 1799.

== Description ==
The monument originally contained an inscription, an imperial eagle symbol and a coat of arms. The inscription and the coat of arms were both erased following the restoration and the return of the Bourbons to Naples. The inscription is not readable anymore and the coat of arms is partly unrecognizable.

== Sources ==
- Michele Marvulli (1996). "La visita della regina Maria Carolina ad Altamura nel 1797 (da un inedito di Luca de Samuele Cagnazzi)". Altamura - Rivista storica/Bollettino dell'a.B.M.C (37).
- Berloco, Tommaso (1985). Storie inedite della città di Altamura (in Italian). ATA - Associazione Turistica Altamurana Pro Loco.
- Ottavio Serena (1899). Altamura nel 1799. Documenti e cronache inedite. Altamura: Tipografia Portoghese.
- A. Du Casse (1854). Mémoires et correspondence politique et militaire du Roi Joseph publiès, annotès et mis en ordre par A. Du Casse Aide De Camp de S. A. I. le prince Jérôme Napoléon (in French). Vol. third tome (2 ed.). Paris: Perrotin, Libraire-editeur. p. 333.
