= Vico del Gargano =

- Comune
- Comune di Vico del Gargano
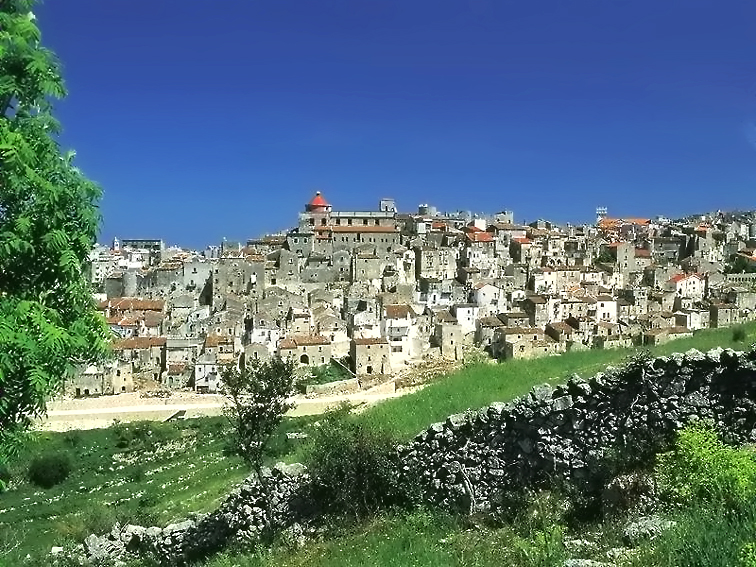
- View of Vico del Gargano

- Location within Italy Location within Apulia
- Coordinates: 41°54′N 15°58′E
- Country: Italy
- Region: Apulia
- Province: Foggia (FG)
- Frazioni: San Menaio

Government
  - Mayor: Michele Sementino

Area
  - Total: 110.53 km^{2} (42.68 sq mi)
- Elevation: 462 m (1,516 ft)

Population (28 February 2017)
  - Total: 7,712
  - Density: 69.77/km^{2} (180.7/sq mi)
- Demonym: Vichesi
- Time zone: UTC+1 (CET)
  - Summer (DST): UTC+2 (CEST)
- Postal code: 71018
- Dialing code: 0884
- Patron saint: Saint Valentine
- Saint day: 14 February
- Website: Official website

Vico del Gargano is a village and comune in the province of Foggia in the Apulia region of southeast Italy. Called the "Village of Love", it is part of the Gargano National Park and the Mountain Community of Gargano.

The town is bordered by Carpino, Ischitella, Monte Sant'Angelo, Peschici, Rodi Garganico and Vieste. It is one of I Borghi più belli d'Italia ("The most beautiful villages of Italy").

== Geography ==
The municipality of Vico del Gargano is located in the northeast part of the Gargano Promontory, covering an area of 110.4 km². The area has an extensive range of altitudes, from 0 to 782 meters above sea level, spanning from the submontane heights of the Umbra Forest to the beaches of San Menaio and Calenella. The inland landscape is characterized by beech and fir woods, while the coast is dominated by Aleppo pine forests, including the Pineta Marzini. On the coast, there are widespread centuries-old olive groves and terraced citrus groves. The geology of the area is primarily karst, with numerous caves, including marine ones.

Vico del Gargano is the heart of the Gargano National Park and encompasses most of the Umbra Forest within its territory.

=== Seismicity ===
The entire municipal territory of Vico del Gargano is part of the seismic district of the Gargano, with a seismic classification of "zone 2" (medium seismicity).

== Main sights ==
Sights include:

- The square-plan Castle and the walls
- Church of the Carmine
- Mother Church (Chiesa Matrice)
- 14th century church of San Marco
- Church of Santa Maria degli Angeli

== Twin towns ==
- Senones, France
- Jettingen, Germany
- Marchin, Belgium
- Vernio, Italy

== Notable people ==
- Pietro Delli Guanti (born 2004), racing driver
