= Domenico Tranaso =

Italian notary (1796–1854)

Domenico Tranaso (1796 - 1854) was a notary from Altamura who was sentenced to eight years of imprisonment in Trani prison in 1850 after attempting to overthrow the government of Altamura in 1848.

== Life ==
Domenico was born in about 1796 in Vieste to Biaggio Tranaso and Gaetana Olivieri. Biaggio's status as a property owner in Vieste likely allowed him to secure a notary position for his son in nearby Altamura by the year 1823. Later in 1823, Domenico married Clemenzia Deluzio, with whom he had eight children.

== Participation in 1848 Altamura riots ==
Tensions in Altamura were high throughout the year 1848, particularly in November with the attempted ouster of Judge Don Costantino Fiorese from Gravina that subsequently led to the National Guard being summoned to the city. On the night of November 5, the Guardhouse that contained the 80 guards that arrived to patrol the city was invaded and looted by a mob of peasants. The soldiers disbanded and the mob removed all the furniture and burned it in the city square.

During this same year, Don Domenico Tranaso, who joined the Progressisti branch of the Carbonari on January 21, had been giving speeches to the people, highlighting grievances against the government and calling for a unified Italian nation. On December 12, Tranaso gave another speech in which he called for the removal of all signs of the current government. He aimed his rhetoric particularly at the Royal Judge, Ferdinando Ruggiero, whose house had been attacked less than two weeks before. At the conclusion of Tranaso's speech, the crowd made its way to the nearby home of the judge while screaming "Abbasso il Giudice ladro e traditore! Fuori, fuori! (Down with the Judge thief and traitor! Come out, Come out!)".

The National Guard troops still stationed in the city were immediately ordered to the house of the judge. Ruggiero attempted to escape, but he was spotted by a group of armed protestors who brought him to Tranaso. Tranaso ordered Ruggiero and all other public officials to leave the city. While government documents are silent about how long the state of anarchy occurred, it did not last long because troops were rushed in from neighboring Bari and other nearby cities to regain control of the city.

== Imprisonment and death ==
Once the government retook control of Altamura, Domenico Tranaso and his son, Biagio, were among the first arrested on December 27. Eight hearings were held in front of the Grand Criminal Court of Trani from July 22 until November 23, 1850, when the verdict was announced. Tranaso was convicted of "verbal and physical abuse against a judge in the performance of his functions, with forcing him to cease from the exercise of his office, accompanied by public violence," and he was sentenced to eight years of imprisonment with a fine of 100 ducats to be paid in four years.

Domenico Tranaso died in prison on September 21, 1854 in Trani.
