= Altamura bread war =

Commercial dispute in Altamura, Italy

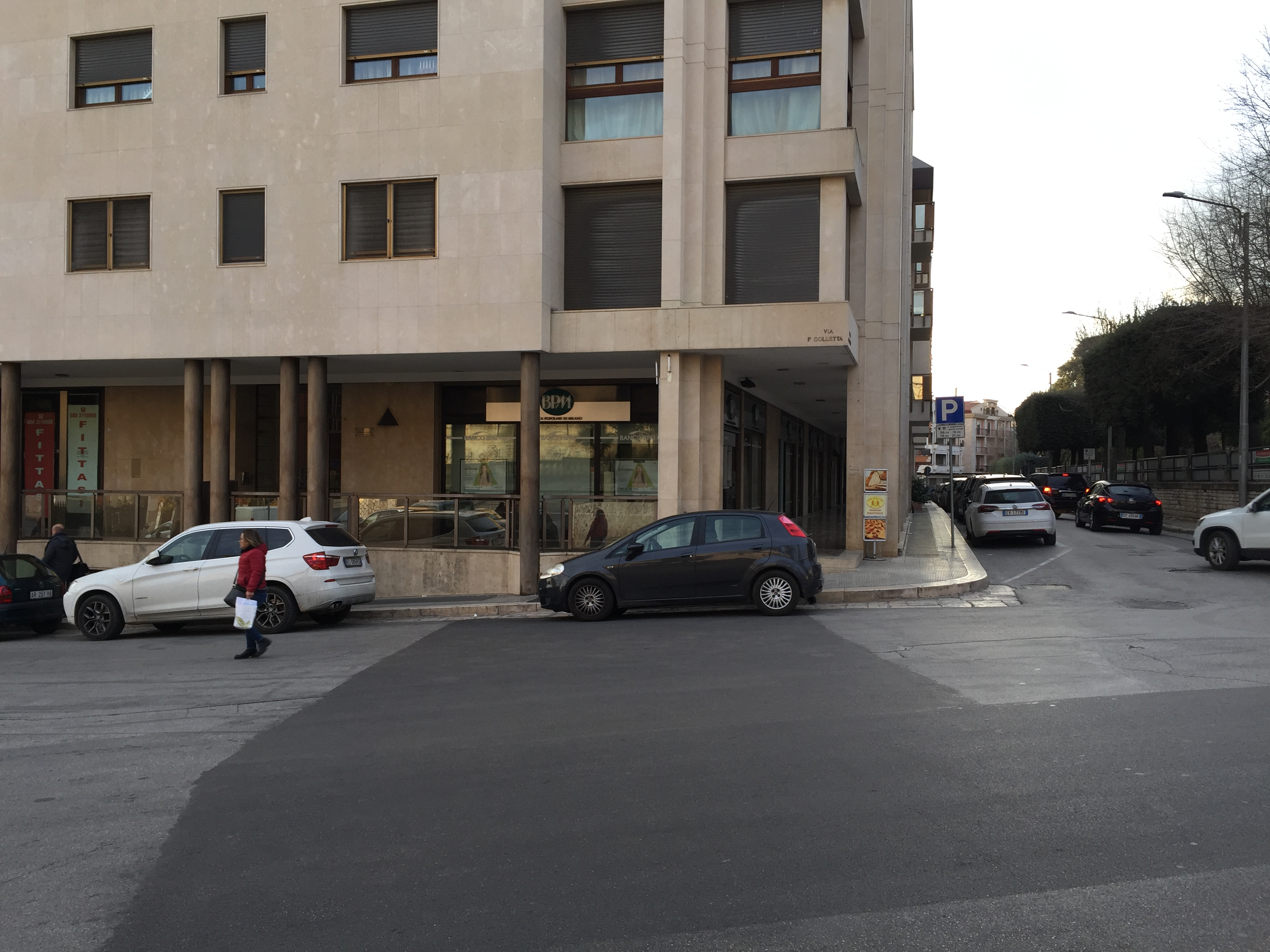
The premises of McDonald's in the early 2000s

The Altamura bread war was a commercial dispute between McDonald's and the local bakery Antica Casa Digesu, that took place between 2001 and 2002 in Altamura, Italy. Despite having more resources, McDonald's was obligated to cease operations in the city after a year due to lack of profitability, as clients preferred to eat the local focaccia.

== Context ==
Altamura is a historical Italian comune known for the quality of its bread. The first historical record discussing the region's bread is from the poet Horace in 37 BC. Since then, the city has developed its own unique bread, Pane di Altamura, that received protected designation of origin status in 2003.

== McDonald's inauguration ==
McDonald's officially inaugurated a unit in Altamura in the beginning of 2001 at the center of the comune, in Via Santa Caterina 17. Initially, the inauguration was seen with good eyes, as it was perceived as something new and exciting, and the coming of globalization to the region. Besides, it generated about 25 new jobs.

== Antica Casa Digesu ==
According to the journalist Onofrio Pepe, McDonald's was quickly perceived as an occupation, as Altamura's population saw it as a challenge to their culture and food. In the beginning, there happened small protests from local food associations.

The fourth-generation baker Luca Digesù opened a bakery, Antica Casa Digesu, right next to McDonald's in hopes of attracting some of their customers.

Initially, McDonald's had the lead, but Digesu had several advantages. Both Luca and McDonald's rented the terrain from the same landlord, Digesù's brother-in-law, and he got a good deal on the rent. Also, a big slice of his focaccia had the same price as a McDonald's hamburger.

With time, locals and tourists gave preference to Antica Casa Digesu. McDonald's tried to fight back by offering school trips, free rentals for children's birthday parties and TVs to stream soccer games, but it officially closed in December 2002 due to lack of profitability. The space was later rented for a jeans store and a bank.

== Legacy ==
McDonald's defeat was notified around the world, with the Italian press comparing the feat with the biblical story of David and Goliath.

Mario Resca, president of McDonald's in Italy, has announced that the company did not perceive their closure as a defeat and that he was happy that locals were appreciating their cuisine.

In 2009, Nico Cirasola released the documentary about the occurrence titled Focaccia Blues.
