= Vieste Lighthouse =

Lighthouse in Italy

Isola di Santa Eufemia
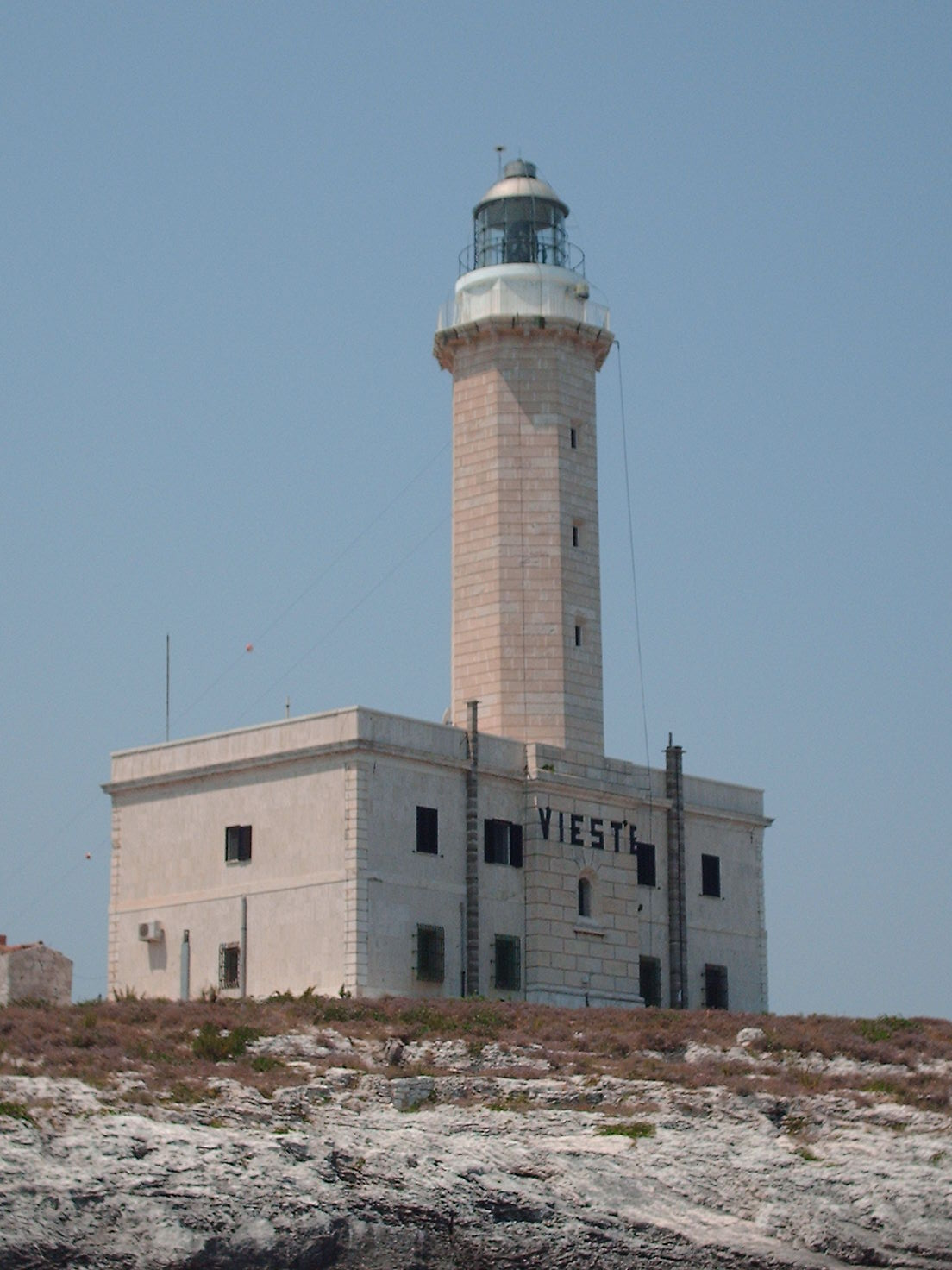
- Vieste Lighthouse
- Location: Isola di Sant'Eufemia; Vieste; Apulia; Italy
- Coordinates: 41°53′21″N 16°11′03″E

Tower
- Constructed: 1867
- Construction: limestone tower
- Automated: 1997
- Height: 27 metres (89 ft)
- Shape: octagonal tower on a two-story keeper's house
- Markings: unpainted white stone tower, grey lantern
- Operator: Marina Militare
- Fog signal: no

Light
- Focal height: 40 metres (130 ft)
- Lens: Type OR 500 focal length: 250 mm
- Light source: electric power distribution
- Intensity: main: AL 1000 W reserve: LABI 100 W
- Range: main: 25 nautical miles (46 km; 29 mi) reserve: 18 nautical miles (33 km; 21 mi)
- Characteristic: Fl (3) W 15s.
- Italy no.: 3816 E.F

Vieste Lighthouse (Italian: Faro di Vieste), on Isola di Santa Eufemia (Island of Saint Euphemia), is an active lighthouse, located between the rocks of Santa Croce and San Francesco, just opposite the town of Vieste, Apulia, Italy. Its position is strategic for the shipping lanes in the middle and lower Adriatic Sea.

== Description ==
The lighthouse was built on plan by Francesco Saverio Gatta in 1867 in limestone; it has an octagonal prism form with balcony and lantern and it is placed atop a two-story building. The unpainted tower is 27 metres (89 ft) high; the lantern is positioned at a height of 40 metres (130 ft) above sea level. The lighthouse was automated in 1997 and is operated by the Lighthouses Service of Marina Militare, identified by the country code number 3816 E.F. The light emits three white flashes in a fifteen-second period visible up to 25 nautical miles (46 km; 29 mi). The lighthouse is completely controlled and operated by the Command Area Lighthouses Navy based in Venice. The Marina Militare has been responsible for managing all the lights along Italy's 8000-kilometre coastline since 1910, using both military and civilian technicians.

The lighthouse receives its electricity by an overhead power line from the Italian mainland. East of the lighthouse is a free-standing lattice tower insulated against ground, used for a DGPS transmitter working on 292.5 kHz.

== See also ==
- List of lighthouses in Italy
