= Altamura Cemetery =

Cemetery in Altamura, Italy

- Cimitero di Altamura
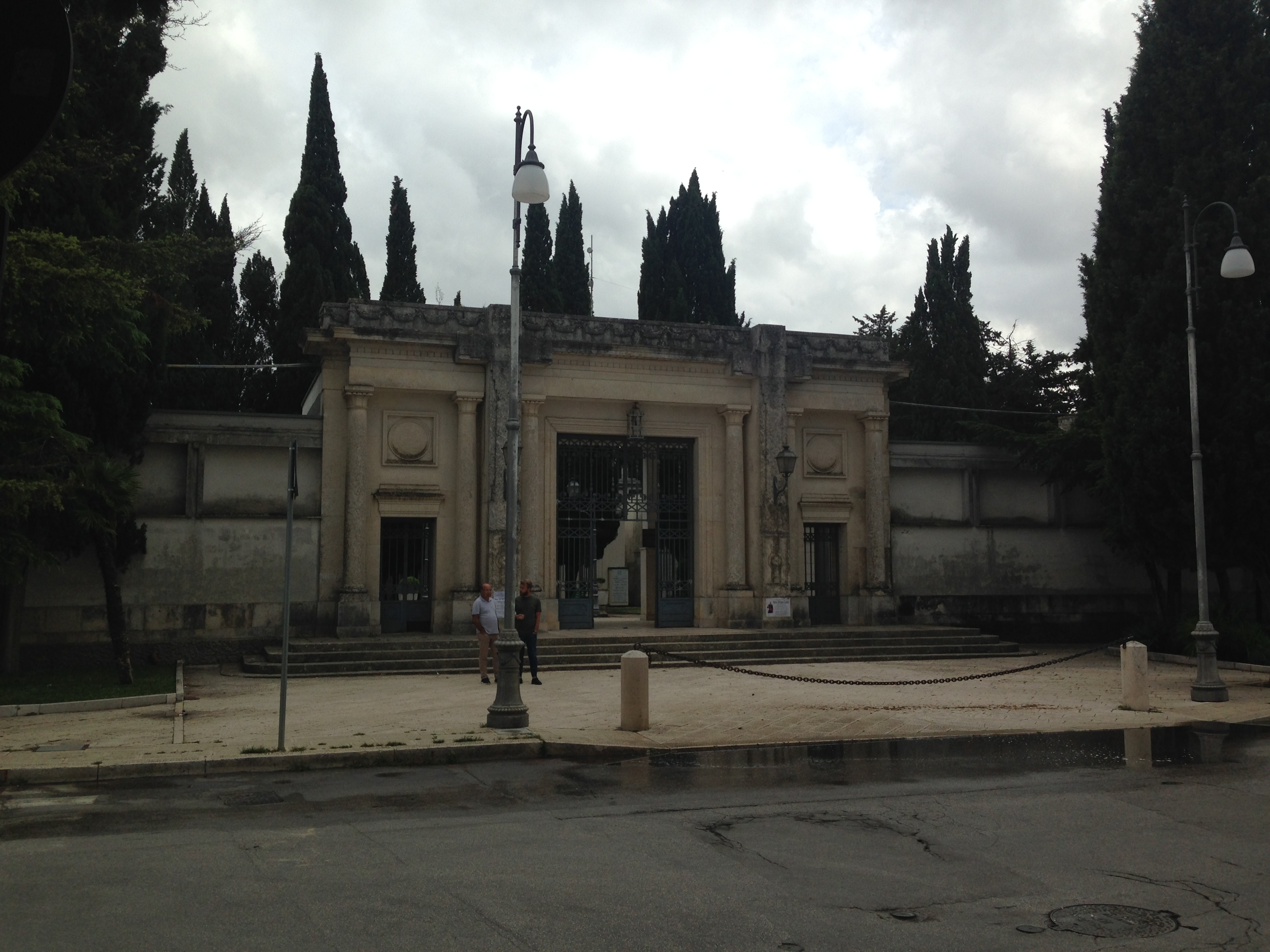
- Entrance of Altamura Cemetery

Details
- Established: 1942
- Location: via Cimitero, Altamura, Italy
- Coordinates: 40°49′33″N 16°32′37″E

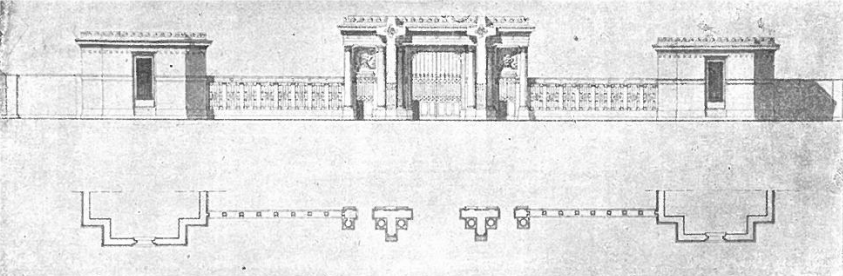
The design of engineer Alberto Gennarini, dating back to the early years of the 20th century. It was never built, but his drawings were reused for the entrance of the cemetery built in 1942.

Altamura Cemetery in Italy was established in 1942 and is still in use. It replaced the previous cemetery (Altmaura Old Cemetery), which is inside the new cemetery. The area of the old cemetery is called il cimitero vecchio ("The Old Cemetery"). The design of the entrance of Altamura Cemetery was based on the drawings of another design made by engineer Alberto Gennarini in the early years of the 20th century.

== Altamura Old Cemetery ==
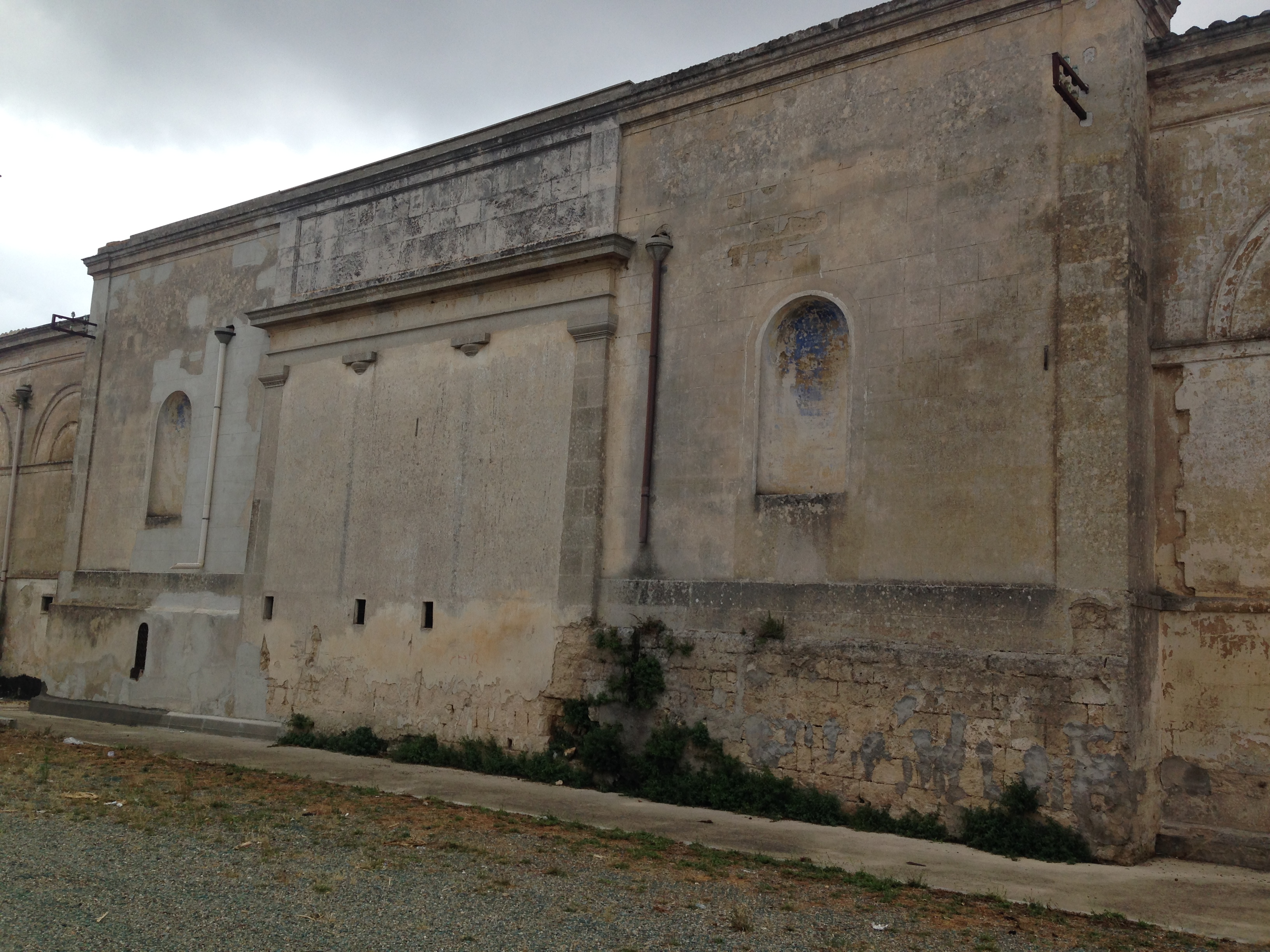
Walled entrance of Altamura Old Cemetery

Altamura Old Cemetery, also called il cimitero vecchio ("The Old Cemetery"), was the first cemetery of the city of Altamura and it was built in the 19th century. The cemetery today has been incorporated into the new cemetery, and the previous entrance is now walled and it has become part of the external walls of the new cemetery. The area of Altamura Old Cemetery (located inside the new cemetery) is called il cimitero vecchio ("the old cemetery").

== See also ==
- Altamura
- Archivio Biblioteca Museo Civico

== Bibliography ==
- Giuseppe Pupillo; Maria Santoro (2017). "Sul cimitero ottocentesco di Altamura". Altamura - Bollettino Dell'a.B.M.C. 58.
