= Pane di Altamura =

Italian bread

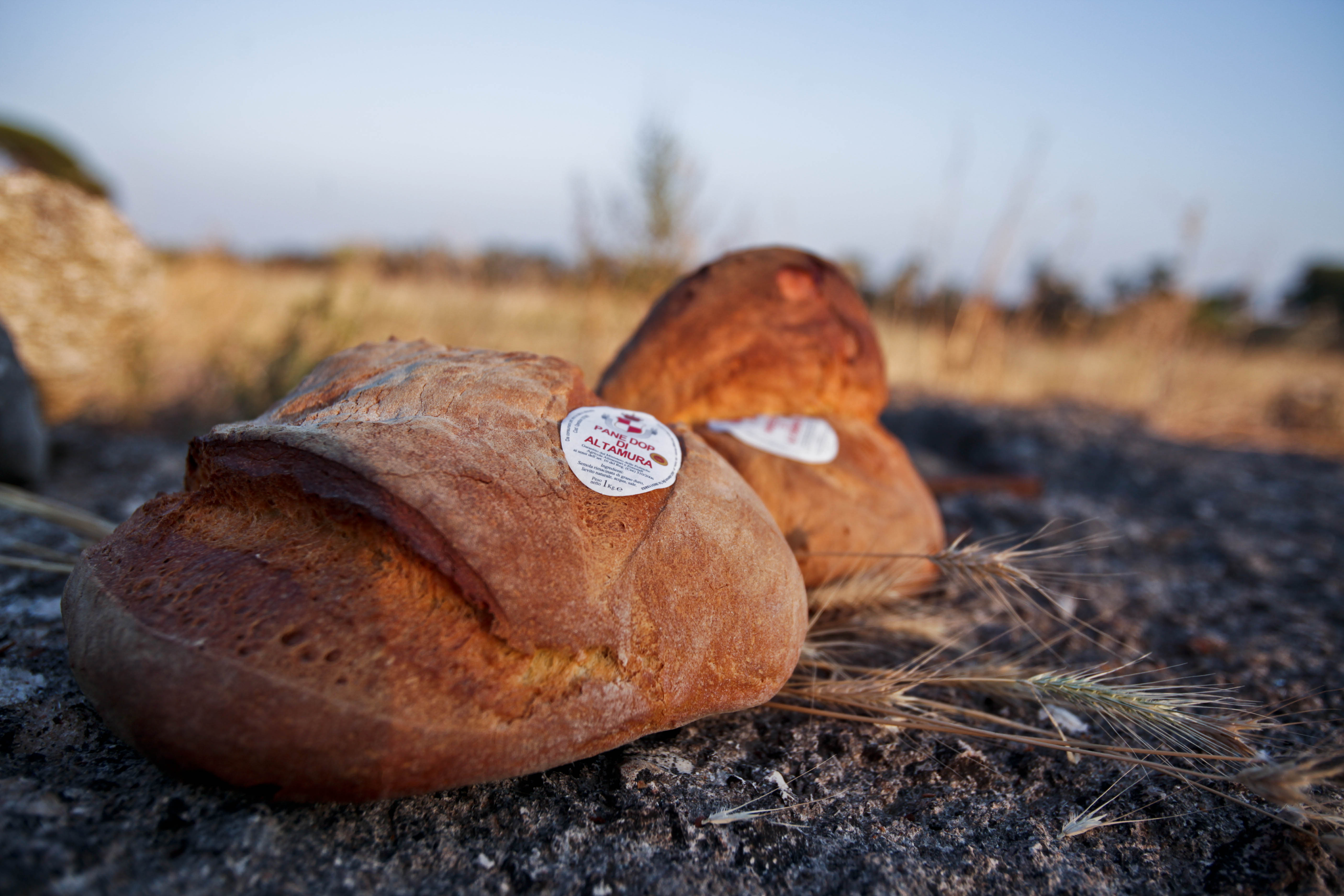
- Type: Bread
- Place of origin: Italy
- Region or state: Altamura, Apulia
- Main ingredients: Remilled durum wheat

Pane di Altamura (lit. 'Altamura bread') is a leavened Italian bread made in the Altamura area of the Apulia region, using local remilled durum wheat. The bread is fragrant, and has a brittle exterior and a chewy, straw-coloured interior.

== History ==
Breadmaking has been described in the Altamura area as early as the first century BC, when the Roman poet Horace praised the local bread in his poetry collection Satires. Other historical records observe breadmaking in the area as early as 1420. The bread may have originated in Matera, a city in the Basilicata region. Residents of the city theorise that they had a secret recipe for the bread, which was stolen by their Apulian neighbours, who have since tried to claim credit for its creation.

Historically, the dough for pane di Altamura was formed and kneaded at home, and then baked in communal ovens. Each loaf was branded with a symbol, generally the initials of the head of the family, to distinguish it. Baking the bread in private ovens was prohibited at threat of a fine. The long shelf life reflects the needs of the remote, rural population it was created for, who needed bread that would last for the full week they would travel. It was historically eaten by dipping it in boiling water, and then served with olive oil and salt.

In 2003, pane di Altamura received protected designation of origin (PDO) status with the establishment of Regulation (EC) No. 1291/2003. As the criteria was made available to the public, interest in the required elements, such as the type of wood used to fuel ovens and wheat varieties, grew. It is popular nationwide and is the most famous bread of Apulia.

== Location ==
Pane di Altamura is made in the area of Altamura, a small town in the Apulia region of southern Italy, not far from the region's capital of Bari.

In 2003, pane di Altamura became the first bread in Europe to receive protected designation of origin (PDO) status, indicating that the bread had a strong connection to the Altamura region. To receive the status, it met the requirements of being made in a specific region with regional ingredients, and having evidence that this impacts the qualities of the food.

== Production ==
Because of its PDO status, pane di Altamura must be made according to a strict set of conditions, making industrial production impractical.

Pane di Altamura is made with a combination of semolina, water, sourdough starter, and salt. By law, the semolina must be remilled, and at least 80% of it must be the hard, locally grown durum wheat, of the Arcangelo, Appulo, Duilio or Simeto varieties. This flour is known as farina di semola rimacinata. The sourdough starter must be produced through a three stage fermentation process, with the fermentation developed at each stage by feeding it with flour and water and by resting. In The Oxford Companion to Italian Food, Gillian Riley adds that malt and fresh yeast are also used.

The dough is formed by combining the ingredients in a ratio of 100 parts semolina, 60 parts water, 20 parts sourdough, and 2 parts salt. For 20 minutes, the dough is kneaded, before it is covered with a piece of cloth and rested for 90 minutes, typically on a wooden surface. After this, the dough is manually shaped, then left to proof. This is repeated twice. Finally, on long wooden paddles, the breads are carefully and skilfully placed one-by-one in an oak wood-fired oven, working from the back of the oven to the front, placing each bread close together to use all available space.

Bread made in a similar fashion, but not in a way to merit certification, is sold as pane tipo Altamura, meaning 'Altamura-style bread'.

== Characteristics ==
Traditional shapes of pane di Altamura

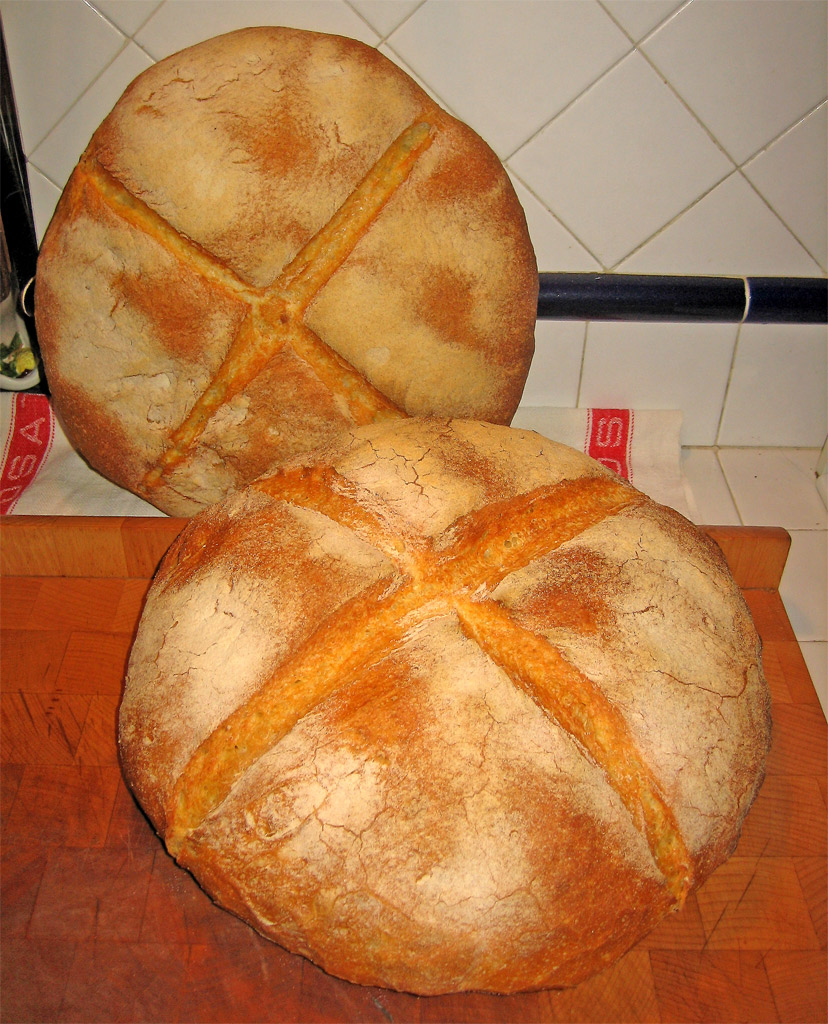
U sckuanéte ('folded loaf')

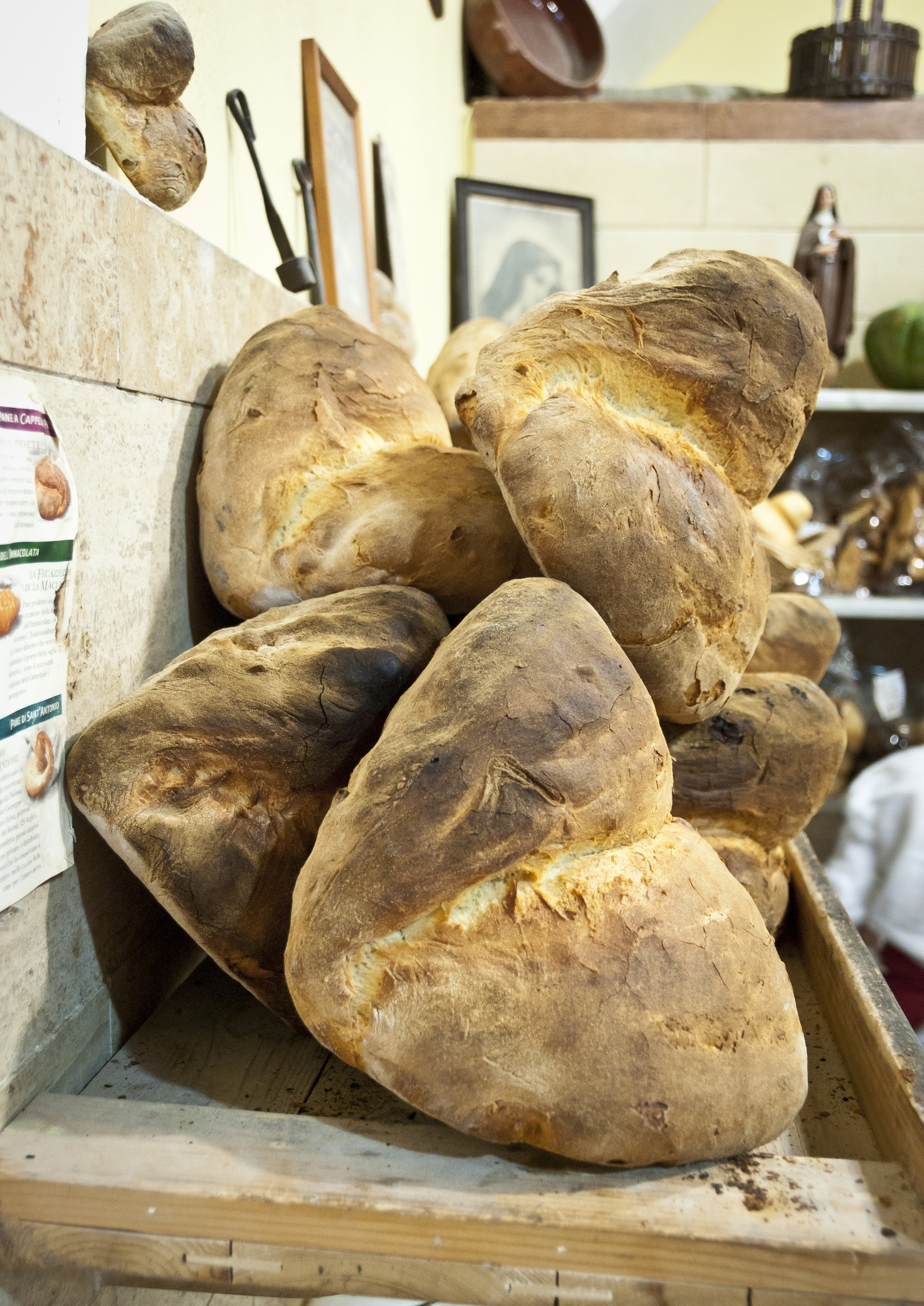
A cappidde de prévete ('priest's hat')

The bread is fragrant, and has a hard, crispy crust and a chewy, straw-coloured interior filled with holes. Many of these attributes are dictated by the law, including the minimum thickness of the crust (3 mm (0.12 in)), as well as moisture content and bubble size. The bread takes its flavour from the wheat flour and sourdough used, and the colour of its crumb from pigments in the semolina. Because the heat of the oven does not completely sterilise the interior, the flavour continues to develop over time. It has a long shelf life of a week, a longevity typical for large loaves of bread.

How large the loaves are varies, but they must weigh more than 0.5 kg (1.1 lb). Loaves commonly weigh up to 2 kg (4.4 lb), and some can be as much as 20 kg (44 lb). Its large size has led to its use as a container for food, storing omelettes, salads, soups, and others to be eaten on lunch breaks. While the bread does not have to be a certain shape to be certified, two traditional types are defined under the PDO regulation. In the first, one side of the dough is folded into the centre, creating a tall loaf. It is known locally as u sckuanéte, meaning 'folded loaf'. The other has a short centre, resembling a "hat with a wide brim". For this, it is known locally as a cappidde de prévete, meaning 'priest's hat'.

== See also ==
- Altamura bread war
- Pane di Laterza
