= Dinosaur Quarry of Altamura =

Altamura Dinosaur Quarry
- Stratigraphic range: Santonian; 85 Ma
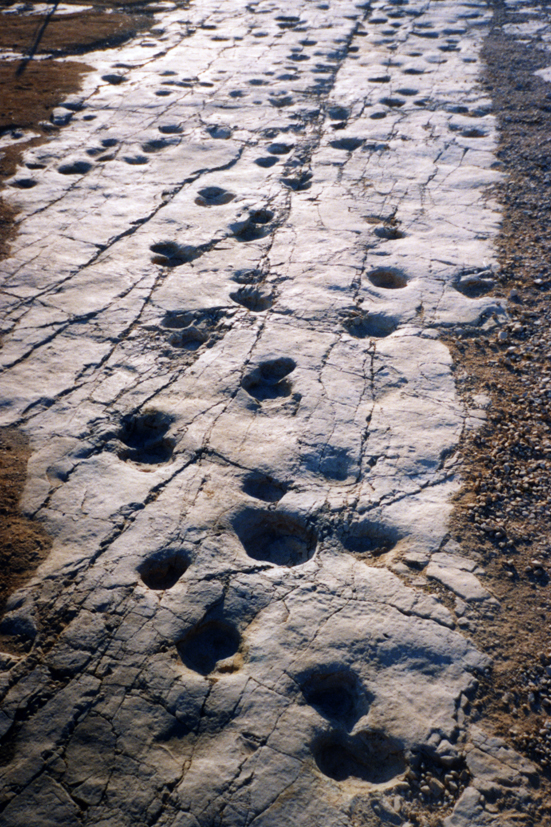
- Some dinosaur footprints from the Dinosaur Quarry of Altamura

Location
- Coordinates: 40.80625°N 16.6245°E
- Country: Italy

The Dinosaur Quarry of Altamura, also known as cava dei dinosauri or cava Pontrelli, is an area of scientific interest located in the countryside of the city of Altamura, Italy, where about 4000 footprints of dinosaurs have been found (according to other sources, they are much more than 4000). It was originally an abandoned quarry located in an area named Pontrelli located on "Via Santeramo", where a kind of carbonate rock known as calcare di Altamura used to be extracted. It originally belonged to the De Lucia family and, after a few changes of ownership, in 2016 it was expropriated. Now it belongs to the Municipality of Altamura due to the remarkable scientific relevance of the discovery.

== History of the discovery ==
The dinosaur footprints were accidentally discovered on May 10, 1999, by two marine geologists of the University of Ancona, Michele Claps and Massimo Sarti, while they were carrying out research on behalf of the company Tamoil. Shortly thereafter, Italian paleontologist and ichnologist Umberto Nicosia searched the area, confirming the authenticity of the discovery and in 1999 he introduced, on the basis of the surveys inside the quarry and together with other collaborators, a new ichnospecies which was given the name of Apulosauripus federicianus referred at an ankylosaurid long 5–6 meters.

== Characteristics ==
The climate of the period the footprints date back to (Upper Cretaceous, 90-65 million years ago) was very different from today. The climate was somehow similar to today's Bahamas and the water levels were probably shallow. According to the most recent theories, the fossilization of the footprints took place thanks to the periodic rise and fall of the sea level (the tide), which allowed the mud to be trampled by various species of dinosaurs. The footprints were then hardened by the phenomenon of diagenesis and, with the return of the water, they were covered with carbonate rocks (formed from fragments of shells and microorganisms). The latter then covered the holes of the footprints, thus fossilizing them.

The discovery of the footprints shed light on some essential paleographic questions about the climate and conditions of the territory at that time. Today's Apulia region was "a promontory of the African continent" and its "palaeographic domain" is known as the "Apulian carbonate platform"; because of the presence of footprints of dinosaurs of various species in this region, the area could never be, as previously assumed, almost totally covered with water.

== The footprints ==
The footprints are from various kinds of dinosaurs, most of which were herbivores, although there are also a few footprints of carnivorous dinosaurs. The footprints are approximately 4000 in number and they are from around two hundred dinosaurs belonging to at least five different species. The size of the footprints varies from 15 to 40–45 cm. Italian paleontologist and ichnologist Umberto Nicosia described it as the "most important Italian or even European site, both for paleobiogeography and ichnology".
