= Liceo classico Luca de Samuele Cagnazzi =

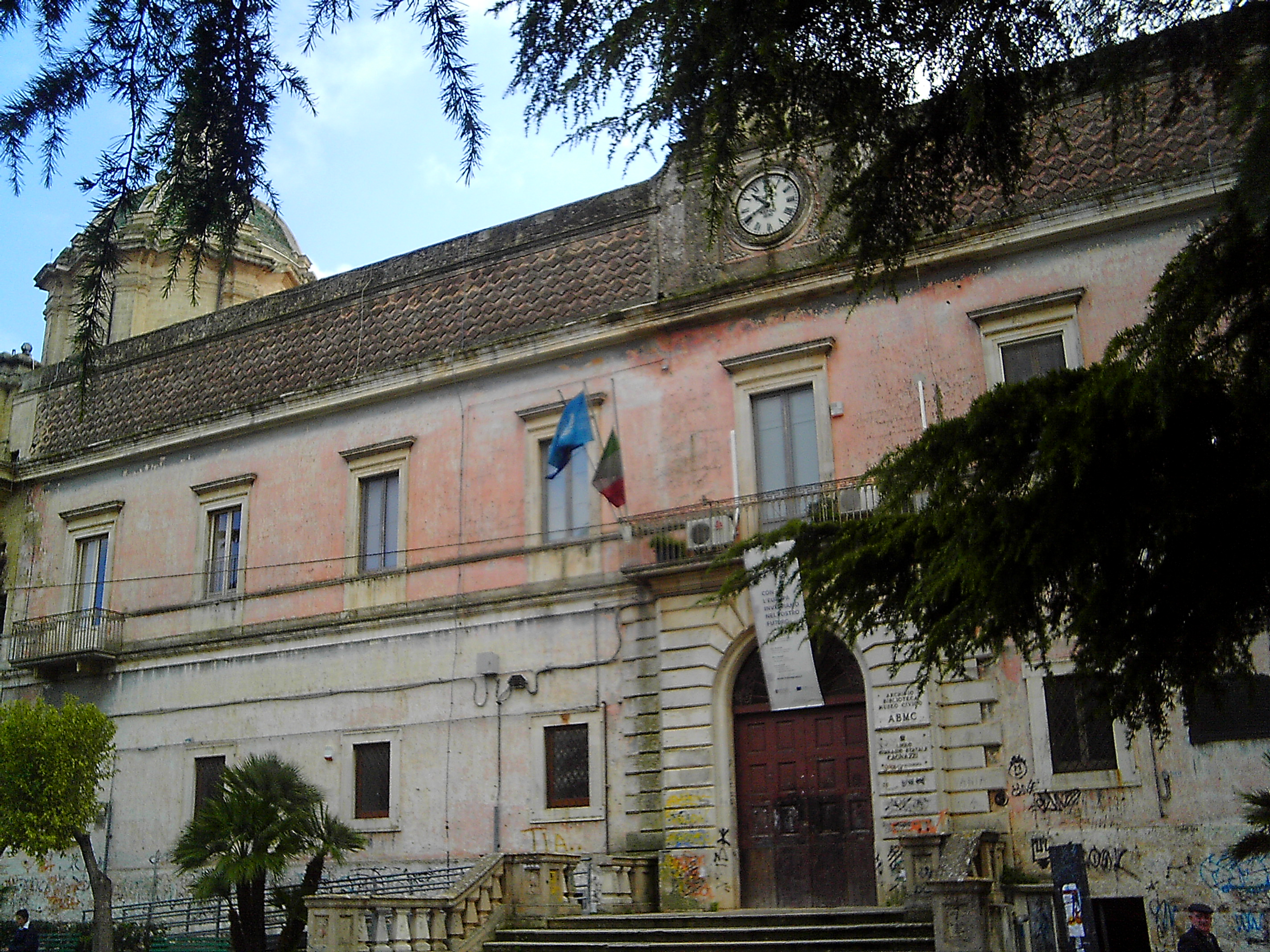
- Liceo classico Luca de Samuele Cagnazzi

Location
- Altamura; Italy
- 40.823674°N 16.553064°E

Information
- Type: High school
- Established: 1861
- Principal: Biagio Clemente
- Website: https://liceocagnazzi.edu.it/

The Liceo classico Luca de Samuele Cagnazzi is an Italian high school located in piazza Zanardelli 30, Altamura, Italy, close to the church Chiesa di San Domenico. It is named after Italian scientist Luca de Samuele Cagnazzi.

== History ==
The first educational institution, which was the ancestor of today's high school was a religious seminary, and precisely the archiepiscopal seminary, which began its activity in 1857 thanks to the bishop of the diocese of Altamura and Acquaviva. A few years later, a technical school was established in Altamura, while in March 1880, it became a high school and it was named after Luca Cagnazzi de Samuele. It became a Regio Liceo Ginnasio with a decree enacted on 27 July 1908.

== Location ==
Before the school was established, the seat of the school was a convent of Dominican friars.

== Collection of scientific instruments ==
The high school stores a valuable collection of ancient scientific instruments, some of which date back to the period of activity of the University of Altamura (1747–1812) and probably some of them are likely to date back to the 18th century.

== Activity ==
Since 1994 the school organizes every year an international contest of classical theater and this event takes place in partnership with the ancient city theater Teatro Mercadante, which has been recently reopened.

== Bibliography ==
- Difesa dei diritti del seminario di Altamura intorno ai beni di sua dotazione. Prato: Tip. Fratelli Giachetti. 1867. p. 1.
- Cristiano Chieppa (2005). L'architetto pugliese Luigi Castellucci e il Seminario di Altamura (articolo su Altamura). Altamura.
- Luca de Samuele Cagnazzi (1944). Alessandro Cutolo (ed.). La mia vita. Milan: U. Hoepli.
- Barbara Raucci (2003). "La diffusione delle scienze nell'Università degli Studi di Altamura: un difficile percorso di affermazione" (PDF). Società Nazionale di Scienze, Lettere e Arti di Napoli and INAF - Osservatorio Astronomico di Capodimonte, Naples.

== See also ==
- Altamura
