= Altamura =

Altamura Jaltamure (Neapolitan)
- Comune
- Comune di Altamura
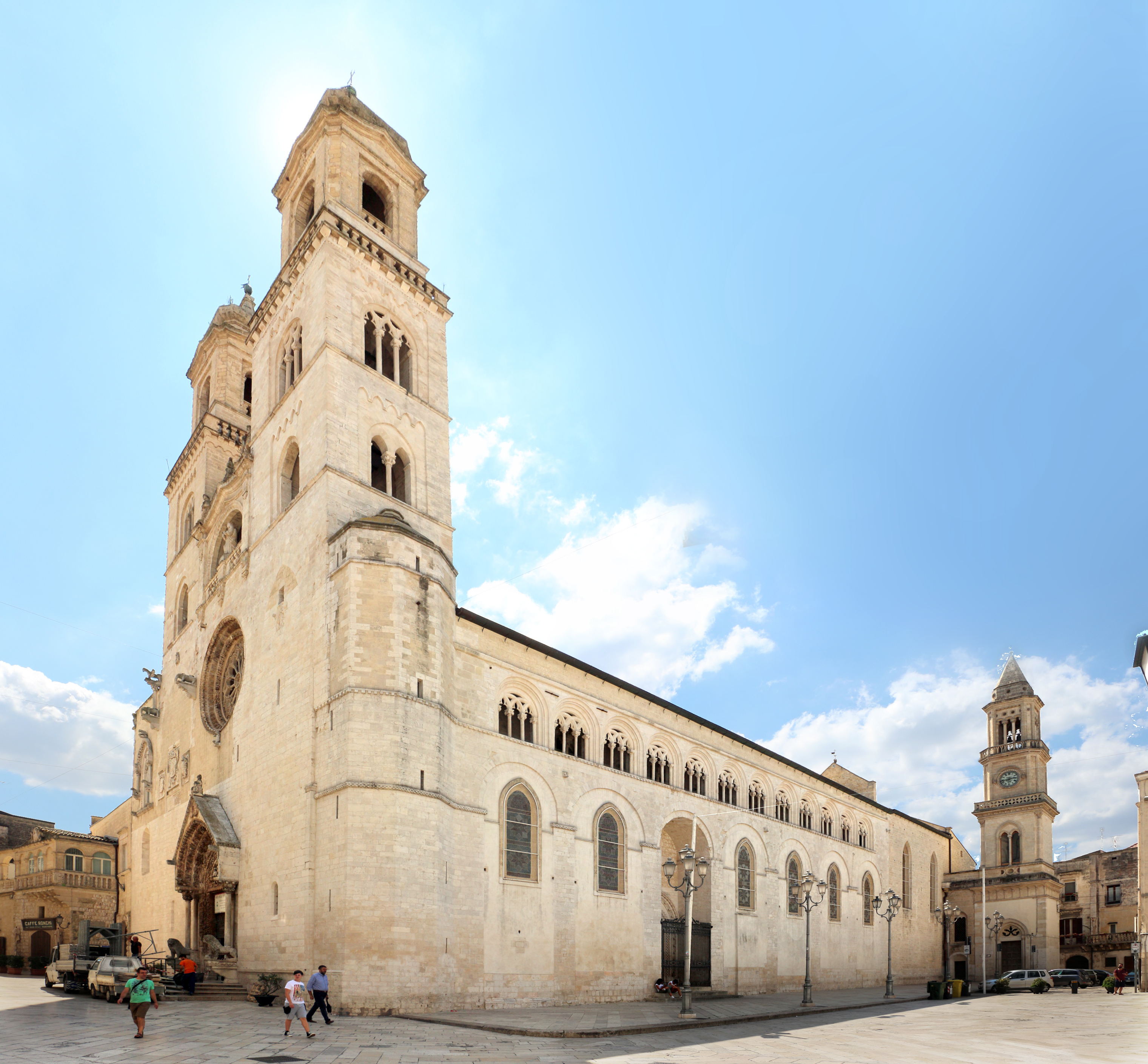
- Altamura Cathedral

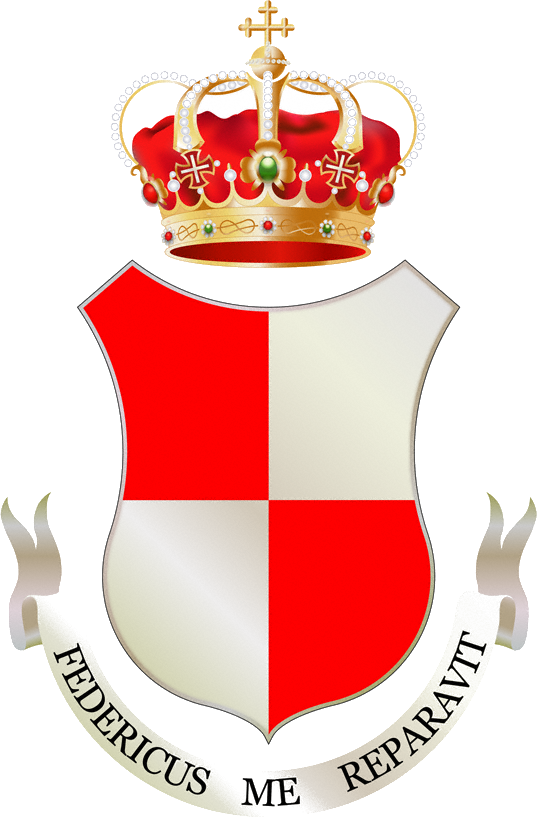
- Coat of arms

- Altamura within the Province of Bari

- Location within Italy Location within Apulia
- Coordinates: 40°49′N 16°33′E
- Country: Italy
- Region: Apulia
- Metropolitan city: Bari (BA)
- Frazioni: Casal Sabini, Fornello, Madonna del Buon Cammino, Marinella, Masseria Franchini, Pescariello, Sanuca

Government
  - Mayor: Francesco Rinaldi

Area
  - Total: 427 km^{2} (165 sq mi)
- Elevation: 450 m (1,480 ft)

Population (31 July 2017)
  - Total: 70,539
  - Density: 165/km^{2} (428/sq mi)
- Demonym: Altamuran
- Time zone: UTC+1 (CET)
  - Summer (DST): UTC+2 (CEST)
- Postal code: 70022
- Dialing code: 080
- Patron saint: Saint Irene of Lecce
- Saint day: May 5
- Website: Official website

Altamura (/ˌæltəˈmʊərə/; Italian: [ˌaltaˈmuːra]; Barese: Jaltamure) is a town and comune of Apulia, in southern Italy. It is located on one of the hills of the Murge plateau in the Metropolitan City of Bari, 45 kilometres (28 miles) southwest of Bari, close to the border with Basilicata. As of 2017, it has a population to 70,595.

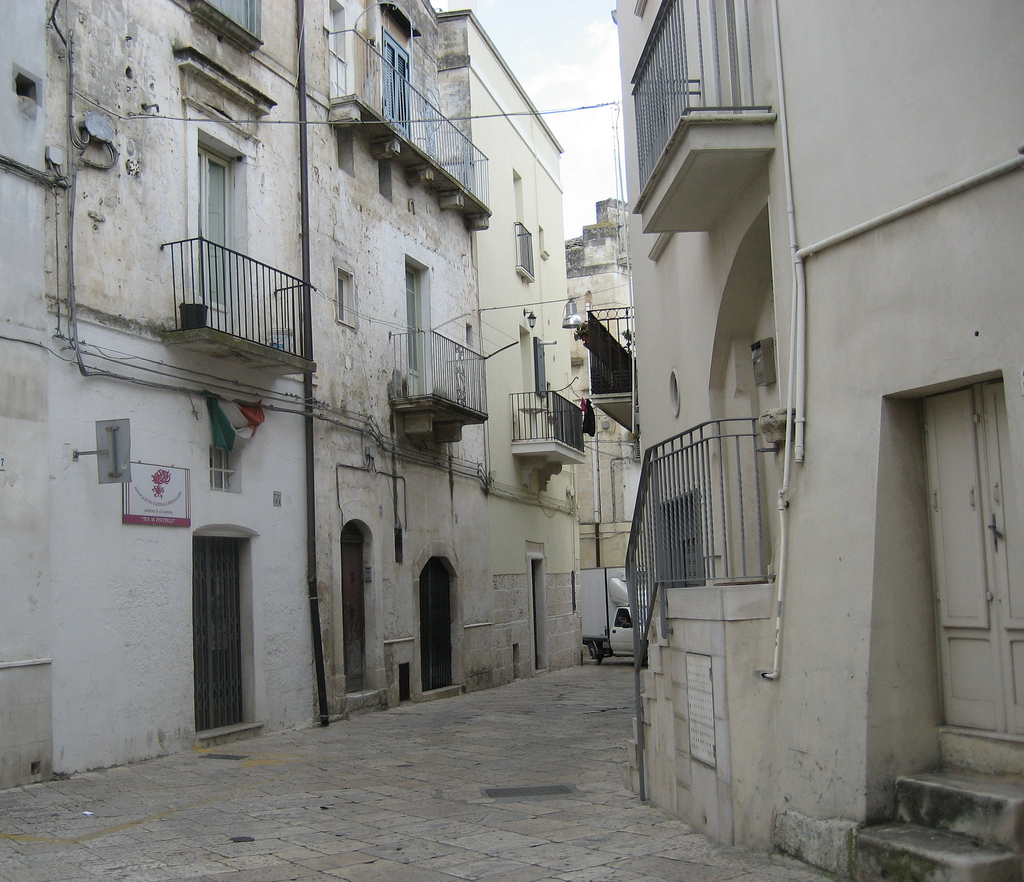
View of a street in the old town

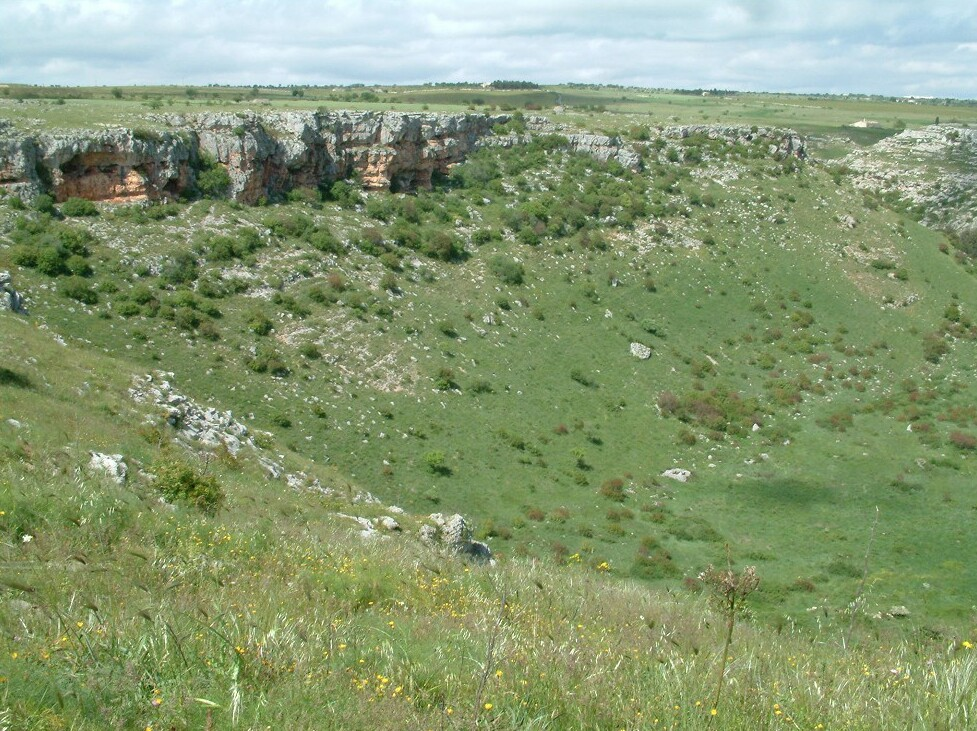
Pulo di Altamura - A large doline in Altamura's territory.

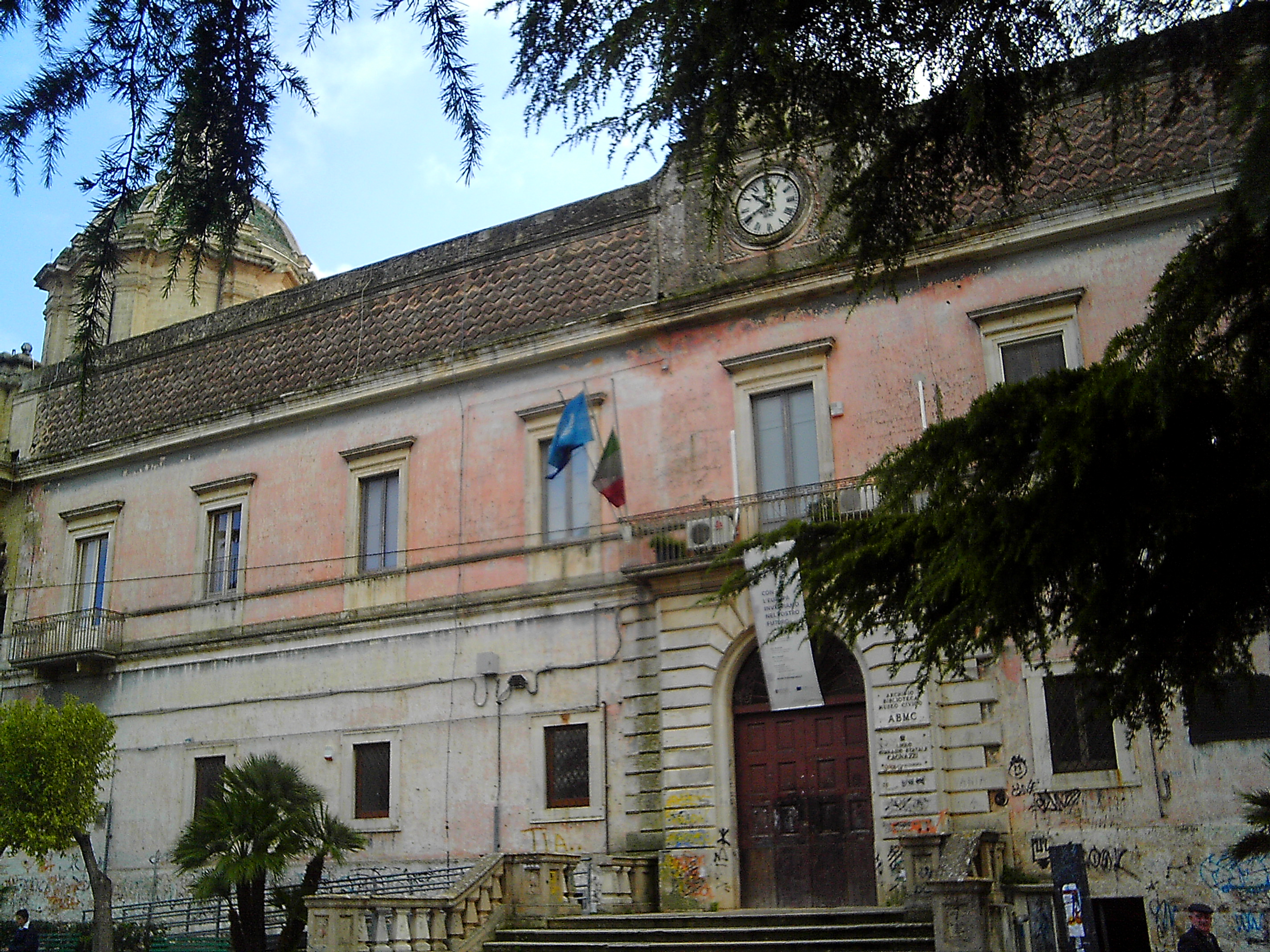
The classical lyceum "Cagnazzi"

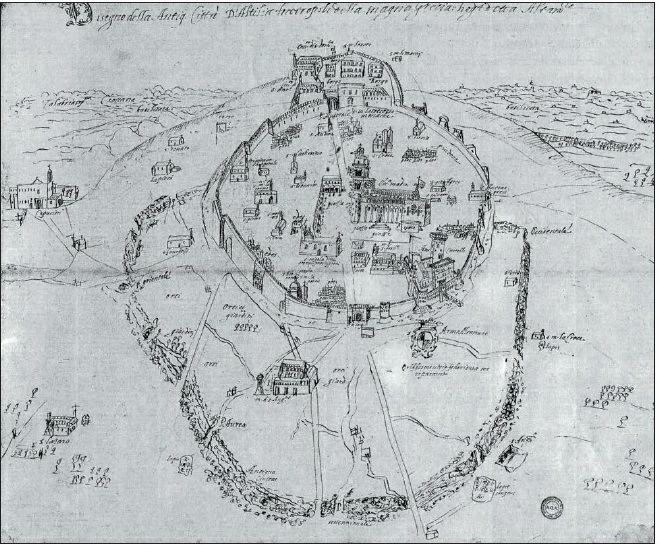
View of Altamura (final years of the 16th century) - Taken from the maps of Angelica Library - Archivio Generalizio Agostiniano, Carte Rocca P/33

The city is known for its particular quality of bread called Pane di Altamura, which is sold in numerous other Italian cities. The 130,000-year-old calcified Altamura Man was discovered in 1993 in the nearby limestone cave called grotta di Lamalunga.

== History ==
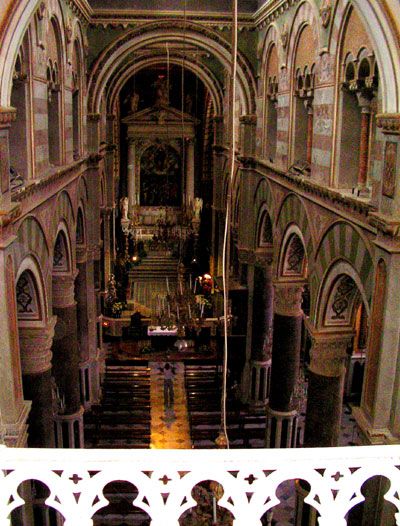
Interior of the Cathedral.

The area of modern Altamura was densely inhabited in the Bronze Age (La Croce settlement and necropolis). The region contains some fifty tumuli. Between the 6th and the 3rd century BC a massive line of megalithic walls were erected, traces of which are still visible in some areas of the city.

=== Ancient city ===
The city was inhabited until around the tenth century AD. Then it was reportedly looted by Saracens. There are no reliable sources confirming what the original name of Altamura was. Inside the Tabula Peutingeriana, only Sublupatia occurs, which may refer either to Santeramo in Colle, Altamura or to a small region nearby named Jesce. Sublupatia implies that a city whose name was Lupatia was also present, even though there is no mention of Lupatia either in Tabula Peutingeriana or the Antonine Itinerary. Nevertheless Lupatia occurs in Ravenna Cosmography (Byzantine period) and in Guido of Pisa's work Geographica (Middle Ages).

According to an ancient legend, appearing for the first time in the 13th century AD, Altamura's former name was Altilia, from Alter Ilium, the "other Troy". According to a legend, it was founded by a friend of Aeneas, Antellus, also a fugitive from the Asian city destroyed by the Greeks. Another legend attributes the foundation to Althea, queen of the Myrmidons. Ottavio Serena, as early as in 1880, rejected the above legends as well as the belief that the ancient name of Altamura was Altilia, as it lacked reliable sources. Serena suggested that this name may have originated with an unknown High Middle Ages scholar who tried to provide an explanation of the ruins found in that place.

During the 15th and 16th centuries AD, Altamura was also mistaken for the ancient city of Petilia. The belief that Petilia was the ancient name of Altamura at that time was so strong that on some Italian translations of Ptolemy's Geography, "Petilia" was translated as "Petilia, now Altamura", despite the coordinates given by Ptolemy unequivocally pointed toward today's Calabria. The hypothesis that Altamura was the ancient city of Petilia probably originated with Raffaello Maffei, as he was the first known author that suggested it. Leandro Alberti, instead, was the first scholar who dismissed that Altamura was Petilia in his work Descrittione [sic] di tutta Italia (1550). According to modern scholars, Petilia probably refers to the archeological remains found on Monte Stella.

=== The new city ===
A couple of centuries after Altamura was reportedly looted by the Saracens, it started to be inhabited again as emperor Frederick II refounded the city (1232) and ordered the construction of the large Altamura Cathedral, which became one of the most venerated sanctuaries in Apulia. In 1248, under pressure from Frederick, Pope Innocent IV declared Altamura exempt from the jurisdiction of the bishop of Bari, making it a "palatine church", that is the equivalent of a palace chapel.

Altamura was ruled by various feudal families, including the Orsini del Balzo and the Farnese (1538–1734), the latter responsible of the construction of numerous palaces and churches. In the past, Altamura also had a large castle, whose construction dated back to the 11th-13th century, which has been completely demolished and is not visible anymore. In 1748 Charles VII of Naples had a university built in the city.

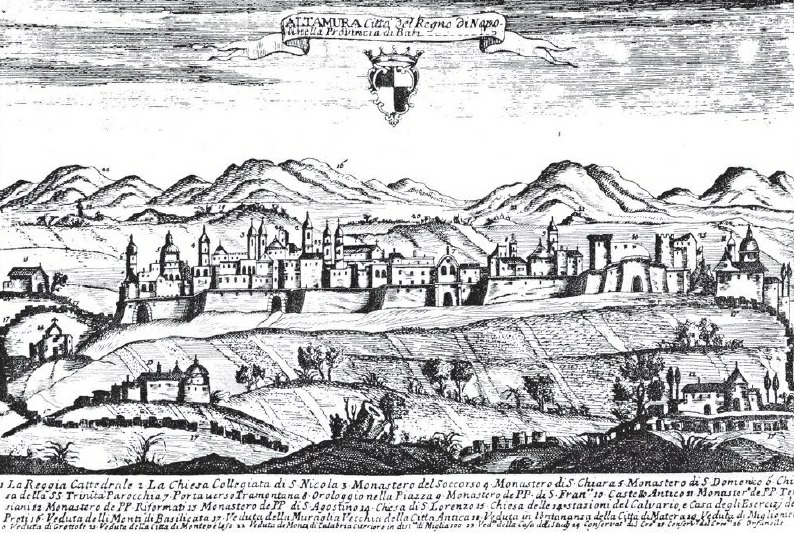
View of Altamura in 1770 ca. (in the center are porta Bari and the ancient castle, now completely demolished)

The Altamuran Revolution occurred in the city in 1799. From 8 February to 9 May, the city was self-governed and it embraced the ideals spread by the French Revolution, with the city joining the Parthenopean Republic after the king had fled to Palermo fearing for his safety. On 9 May, Sanfedisti reached Altamura, and after a battle on the city walls, the rule of the Kingdom of Naples was restored in Altamura. During the Risorgimento (19th century), Altamura was the seat of the Insurrection Bari Committee and, after the unification, the provisional capital of Apulia.

During World War II, the transit camp known as P.G. 51 was located at Villa Serena in Altamura.

== Geography ==
The city is located in the south-west area of the Metropolitan City of Bari, near the borders with the Province of Matera, in Basilicata. The bordering municipalities are Bitonto, Cassano delle Murge, Gravina in Puglia, Grumo Appula, Matera, Ruvo di Puglia, Santeramo in Colle and Toritto.

Some 12,660 hectares (31,300 acres) of the communal territory are included in the Alta Murgia National Park.

== Demographics ==
Historical population

Year	Pop.	±%
1861	17,499	—
1871	17,275	−1.3%
1881	20,013	+15.8%
1901	22,683	+13.3%
1911	25,616	+12.9%
1921	27,272	+6.5%
1931	29,025	+6.4%
1936	31,431	+8.3%

Year	Pop.	±%
1951	39,586	+25.9%
1961	43,735	+10.5%
1971	45,600	+4.3%
1981	51,346	+12.6%
1991	57,874	+12.7%
2001	64,167	+10.9%
2011	69,529	+8.4%
2021	69,855	+0.5%

Source: ISTAT

== Main sights ==
Altamura's main landmark is the Romanesque cathedral, begun in 1232 by Frederick II and restored in 1330 and 1521–47. It is one of the four Palatine churches of Apulia, the others being the cathedral of Acquaviva delle Fonti, the Basilica of San Nicola in Bari and the church of Monte Sant'Angelo sul Gargano. The construction is influenced by that of Bari, but also with strong Gothic influences typical of the time of Frederick II. The orientation of the construction was probably changed during the 14th century restoration, to which also belongs the northern portal opening on the square; a second bell tower, the altar area and the sacristy are instead from the 16th century. Externally, the main features are the rose window, with 15 small columns radially intermingling, and the Gothic portal, set into the entrance portico standing on two stone lions. On the arch of portals are sculpted 22 panels with scenes from Jesus' life. The interior, with a nave and two aisles, has stone presepe by Altobello Persio (1587).

The medieval walls, erected by Frederick II, rest upon the megalithic walls of an ancient city of unknown name. These early walls are of rough blocks of stone without mortar.

Ancient tombs with fragments of vases and terracottas have also been found, of which there is a collection at the Museo Archeologico Statale di Altamura. There are caves which have been used as primitive tombs or dwellings, and a group of some fifty tumuli near Altamura.

Some thirty thousand dinosaur footprints were discovered in 1999 in Altamura's territory named "contrada Pontrelli", making it a major site for the study of dinosaurs.

== Events ==
A three-day medieval fair called Federicus is held every year in the city, usually on the last weekend of April.

== Economy ==
Banca Popolare di Puglia e Basilicata, a cooperative bank of southern Italy, is based in Altamura. The bank is a successor of Banca Popolare della Murgia.

== Education ==
- Liceo classico Luca de Samuele Cagnazzi

== Museums ==
- Archivio Biblioteca Museo Civico
- National Archaeological Museum of Altamura
- Museum of Typography Portoghese
- Alta Murgia Ethnographic Museum
- Altamura Diocesan Museum Matroneum (MUDIMA), located inside Altamura Cathedral's matroneum

== Transport ==
The city is crossed by the SS7 "Via Appia" national road.

Altamura railway station, operated by the national company FS and by FAL, is located on the regional lines Rocchetta Sant'Antonio-Altamura-Gioia del Colle (FS), Bari-Altamura-Matera (FAL) and

Altamura-Avigliano-Potenza (FAL). Also the municipal localities of Casal Sabini, Marinella and Pescariello have their own stations. The one of Sanuca was closed in the late 1990s.

== Twin towns – sister cities ==
Altamura is twinned with:

- Lucera, Italy
- Modica, Italy
- Castellana Sicula, Italy

== People ==
- Giovanni Antonio Del Balzo Orsini (1386 or 1393–1463), prince of Taranto
- Giacomo Tritto (1733–1824), composer
- Giuseppe Ciccimarra (1790–1836), opera singer
- Saverio Mercadante (1795–1870), opera composer
- Domenico Tranaso (1796–1854), notary
- Giacomo Bellacchi (1838–1924), mathematician
- Giuseppe Oronzo Giannuzzi (1838–76), physiologist
- Ottavio Serena (1837-1914), Italian politician and historian
- Nicola Serena di Lapigio (1875–1938), writer and journalist
- Donato Squicciarini (1927–2006), Catholic archbishop
- Romeo Sacchetti (born 1953), former basketball player
- Francesco Caputo (born 1987), football player
- Mary Valastro Pinto (née Tubito), former employee of Carlo's Bake Shop and character of the TLC network program Cake Boss, as well as mother of Buddy Valastro

== Military ==
The 31st tank regiment of the Italian Army is stationed at Altamura.

== See also ==
- Altamura Cathedral
- Altamura Castle
- Pane di Altamura
- Altamurana
- Altamura Man
- Epitaph of Altamura
- Federicus
- Pulo di Altamura
- Altamuran Revolution
- University of Altamura
- Dinosaur Quarry of Altamura

== Sources ==
- Berloco, Tommaso (1985). Storie inedite della città di Altamura. ATA - Associazione Turistica Altamurana Pro Loco.
- Pupillo, Giuseppe (2017). Altamura, immagini e descrizioni storiche (PDF). Matera: Antezza Tipografi. ISBN 9788889313282. Archived from the original (PDF) on 2018-10-21.
