= Vieste =

Vieste Vìst (Neapolitan)
- Comune
- Comune di Vieste
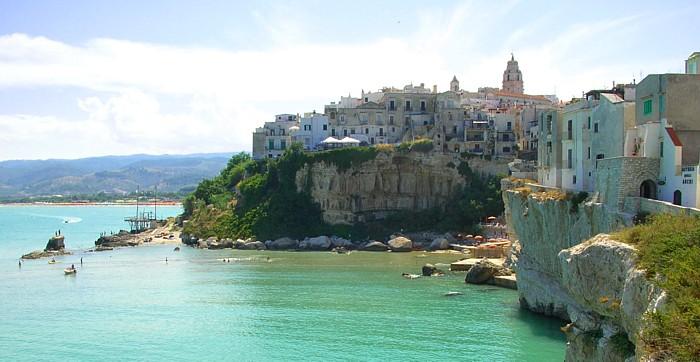
- View of Vieste

- Coat of arms

- Location within Italy Location within Apulia
- Coordinates: 41°53′N 16°10′E
- Country: Italy
- Region: Apulia
- Province: Foggia (FG)
- Frazioni: Pugnochiuso, Baia di Campi

Government
  - Mayor: Giuseppe Nobiletti

Area
  - Total: 167.52 km^{2} (64.68 sq mi)
- Elevation: 43 m (141 ft)

Population (28 February 2017)
  - Total: 13,931
  - Density: 83.160/km^{2} (215.38/sq mi)
- Demonym: Viestani
- Time zone: UTC+1 (CET)
  - Summer (DST): UTC+2 (CEST)
- Postal code: 71019
- Dialing code: 0884
- Patron saint: Santa Maria di Merino, Saint George
- Saint day: 9 May and 23 April
- Website: Official website

Vieste (Italian: [ˈvjɛste, viˈɛste]; Viestano: Vìst) is a town, comune and former Catholic bishopric in the province of Foggia, in the Apulia region of southeast Italy. A marine resort in Gargano, Vieste has received Blue Flags for the purity of its waters from the Foundation for Environmental Education. The area covered by the comune is included in the Gargano National Park.

== History ==
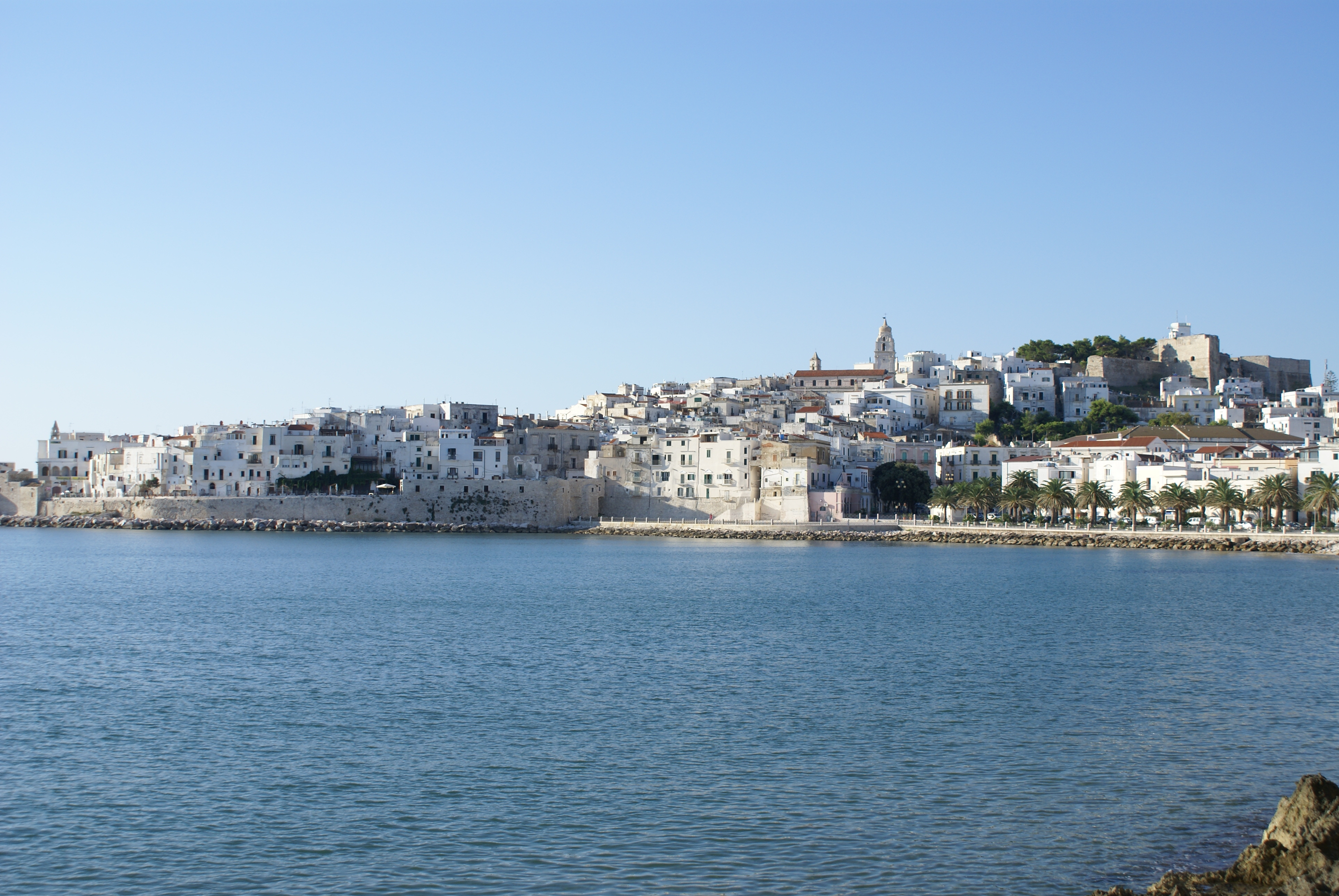
View from the port

In medieval times, the port was frequently attacked by pirates, Saracens and other enemies of the Kingdom of Naples.

In 1554 approximately 7,000 inhabitants were enslaved by the Barbary Pirates. Those deemed too elderly or infirm for slavery were executed. This event is commemorated in an annual ceremony.

== Geography ==
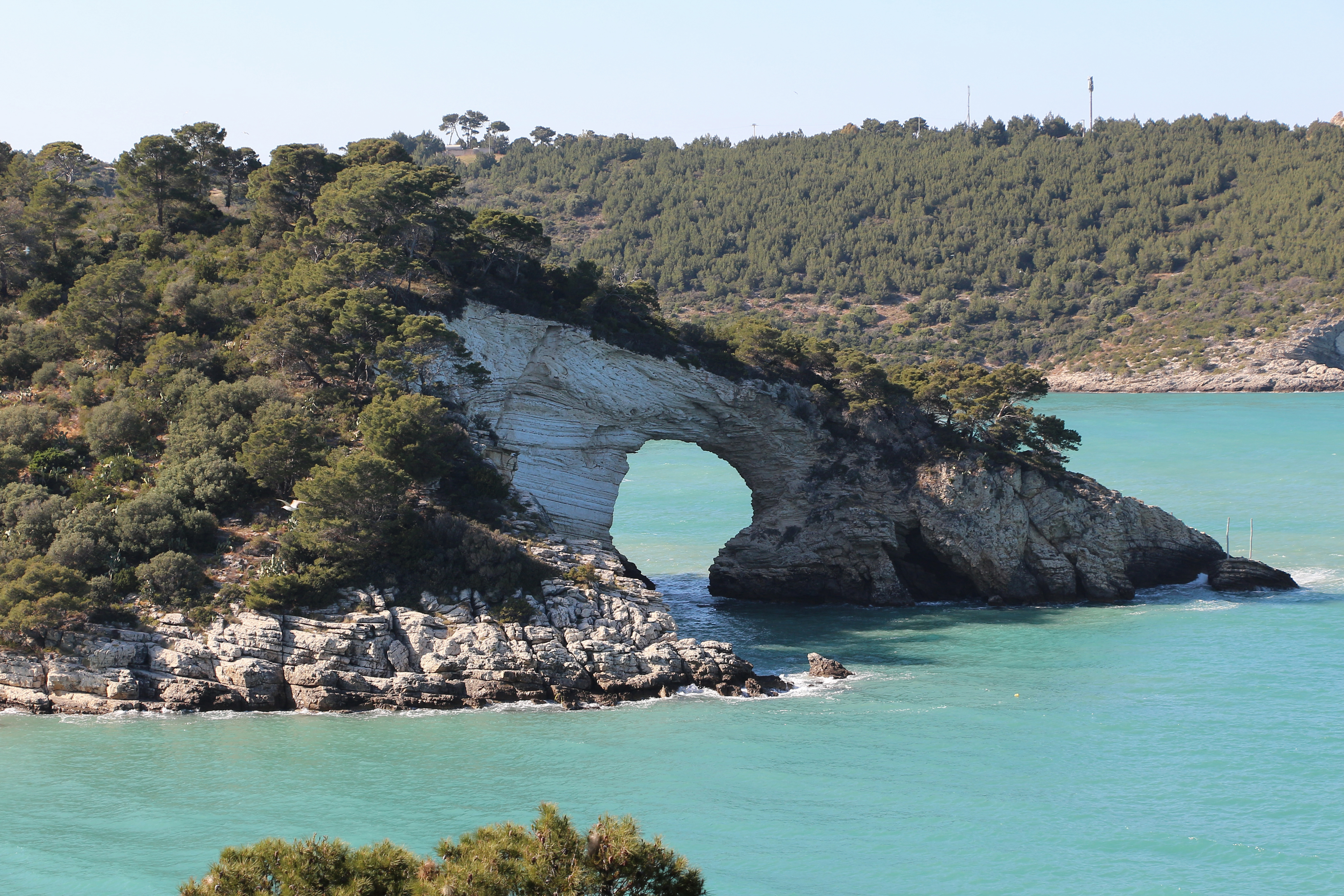
An example of erosion on the coast

The town is bordered by Mattinata, Monte Sant'Angelo, Peschici and Vico del Gargano. The coastal cliffs are composed of chalk-like white limestone, sparsely banded with thin layers of flint. Next to the town there are two large, straight beaches. The remainder of the coast is composed of gulfs and small, hidden sandy beaches. Erosion by water and wind has shaped the calcareous rock into grottoes and arches. The coast is rugged, and many sights are accessible only by sea.

== Pizzomunno and its legend ==
Vieste's best-known landform is Pizzomunno, a sea stack standing 26.6 m (87 ft) high, situated on the Spiaggia del Castello ("Castle Beach").

The stone connects to a local legend about a fisherman called Pizzomunno whose true love was captured by sirens and imprisoned under the sea. The story tells how he swam out to rescue her, but became exhausted and gave up hope, turning to stone. Other myths about the rock are that it disappears on some nights, and that a wish made while circling it will come true.

== Economy ==
Until a few decades ago, Vieste's primary economy was fishing and agriculture. Now tourism, with hotels, resorts and camping facilities, has transformed the town's appearance, economy and lifestyle.

== Notable buildings ==
- A castle, with a triangular shape and bastions at its vertexes.
- Vieste Cathedral in Apulian Romanesque style. It has a basilica plan with a nave and two aisles. Its bell tower was rebuilt in Baroque style in the 18th century after the previous one collapsed.
- Vieste Lighthouse, built in 1867
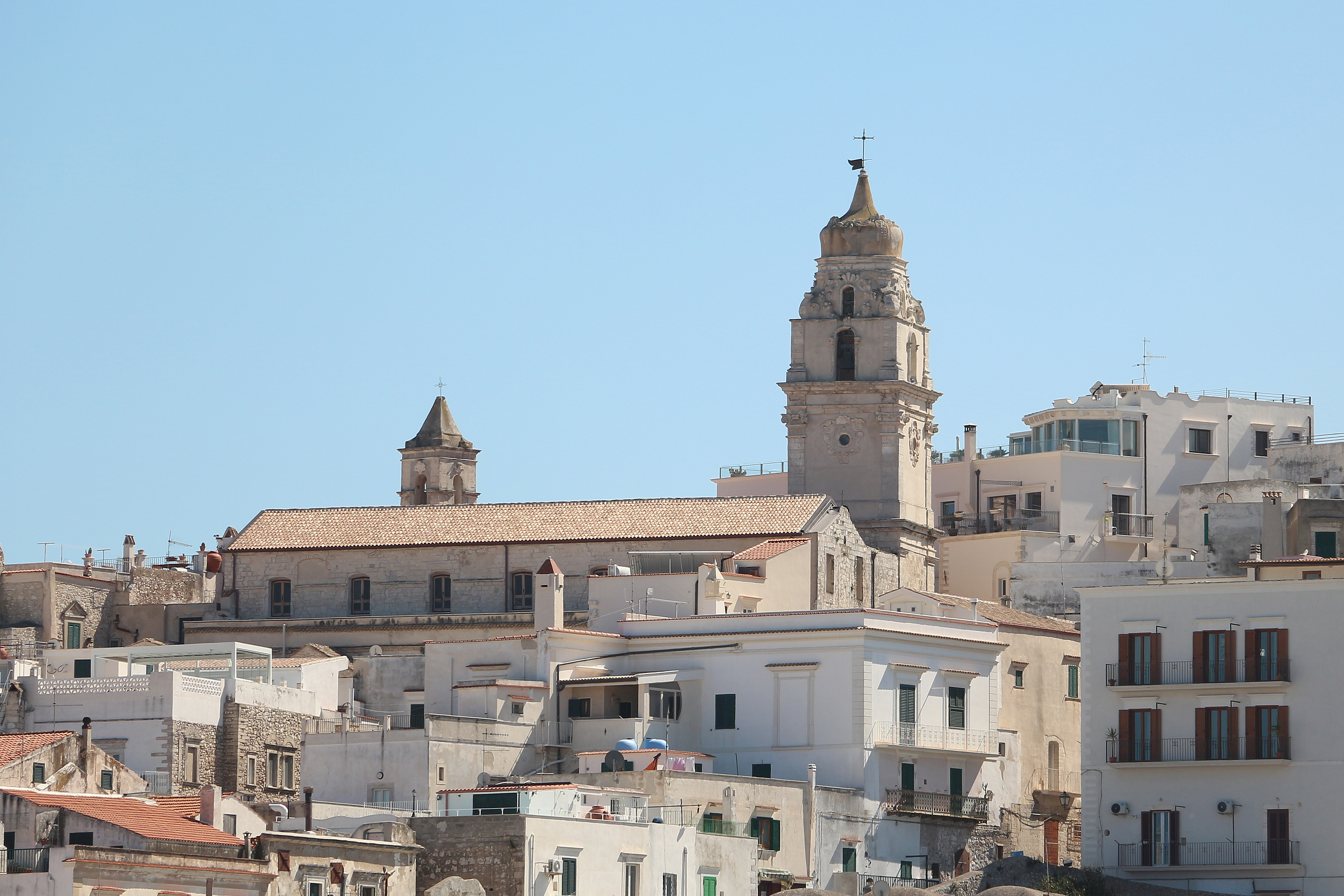
Vieste Cathedral

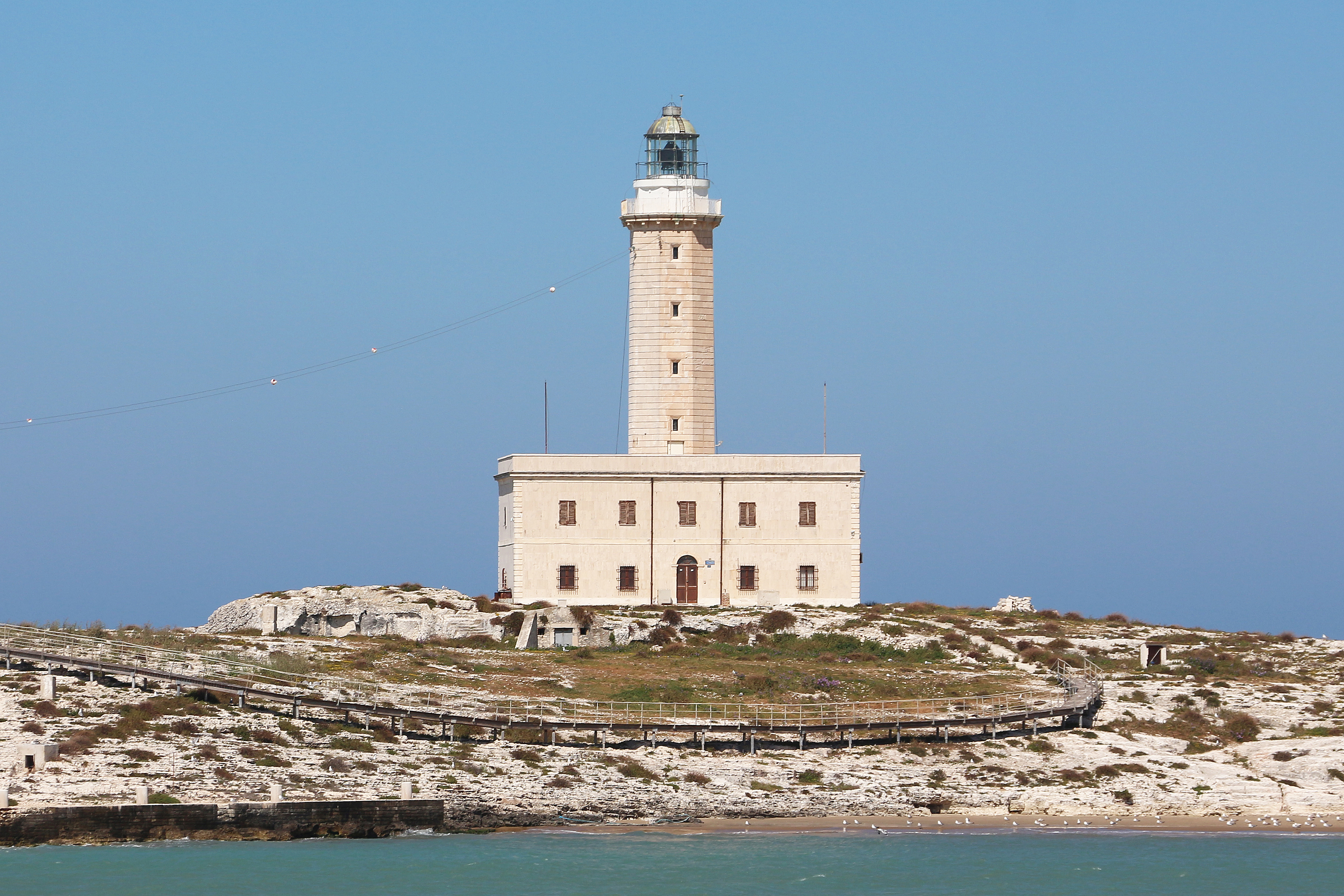
Vieste Lighthouse

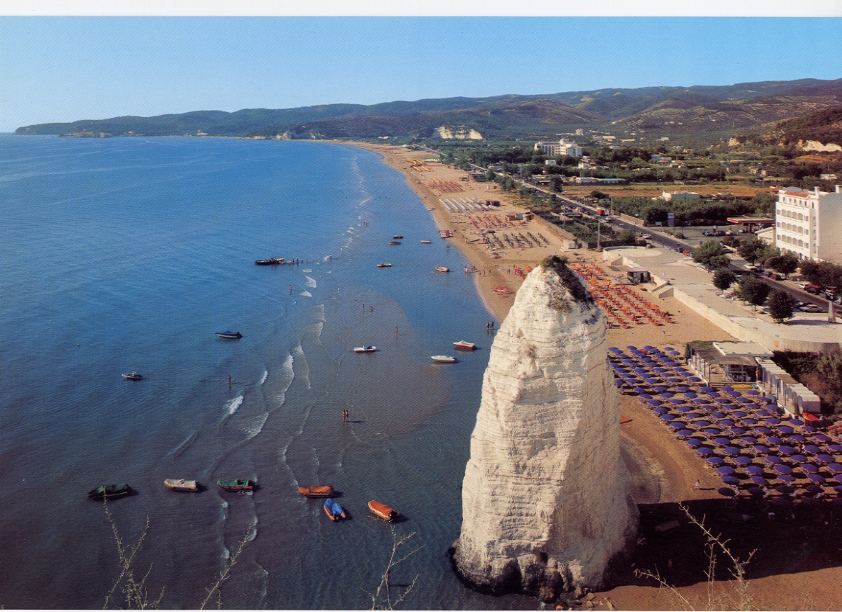
The sea stack Pizzomunno standing at the north end of the Spiaggia del Castello (Castle Beach)

== See also ==
- Isola Santa Eufemia Lighthouse
