= Peschici =

Peschici Peschëcë (Neapolitan)
- Comune
- Comune di Peschici
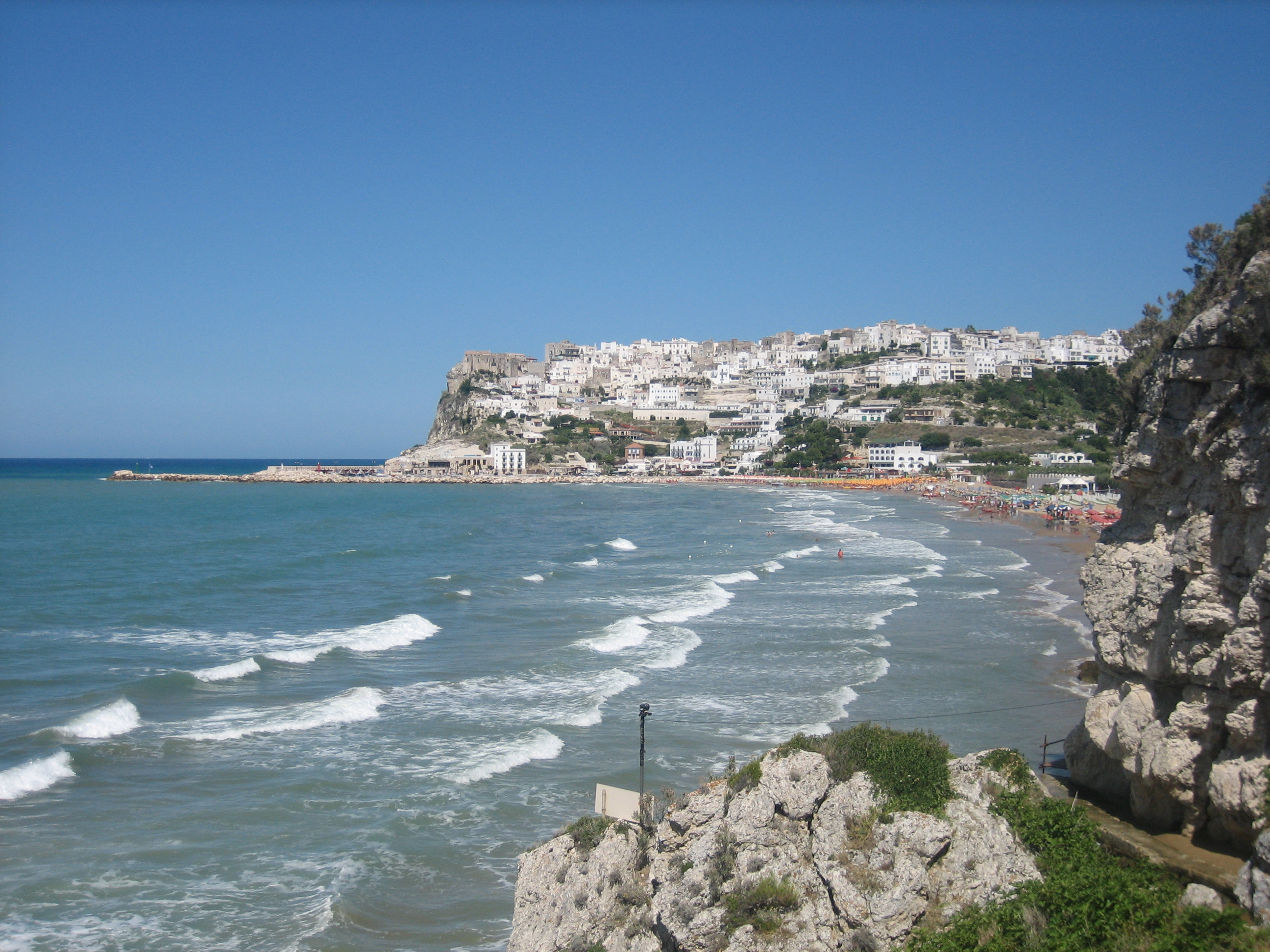
- View of Peschici

- Coat of arms

- Location within Italy Location within Apulia
- Coordinates: 41°56′48″N 16°0′53″E
- Country: Italy
- Region: Apulia
- Province: Foggia (FG)
- Frazioni: Manaccora, San Nicola

Government
  - Mayor: Francesco Tavaglione

Area
  - Total: 48.92 km^{2} (18.89 sq mi)
- Elevation: 90 m (300 ft)
- Highest elevation: 378 m (1,240 ft)
- Lowest elevation: 0 m (0 ft)

Population (28 February 2017)
  - Total: 4,491
  - Density: 91.80/km^{2} (237.8/sq mi)
- Demonym: Peschiciani
- Time zone: UTC+1 (CET)
  - Summer (DST): UTC+2 (CEST)
- Postal code: 71010
- Dialing code: 0884
- Patron saint: St. Elijah
- Saint day: 20 July
- Website: Official website

Peschici (Italian: [ˈpɛskitʃi]; Northern Apulian: Peschëcë) is a town and comune (municipality) in the province of Foggia in the Apulia region of southeast Italy. Famous for its seaside resorts, its territory belongs to the Gargano National Park and to the Gargano Mountain Community.

== Geography ==
Peschici is situated on the north-eastern coast of Gargano promontory, 9 kilometres (5.6 mi) east of San Menaio, 14 kilometres (8.7 mi) from Rodi Garganico, and 19 kilometres (12 mi) west of Vieste. The town sits over a karst spur facing the sea, with a height of more than 100 metres (330 ft); the territory features a number of coastal watch towers. Flora includes sectors of Mediterranean shrubland and, in the inner areas, Aleppo pines. 32 kilometres (20 mi) north east of the town Peschici, is the Croatian Island of Palagruža.

The lexicographer Giacomo Micaglia was born in Peschici.

== See also ==
- Apulia
- Gargano
- Capitanata
- Tavoliere delle Puglie
