= San Menaio =

- Frazione
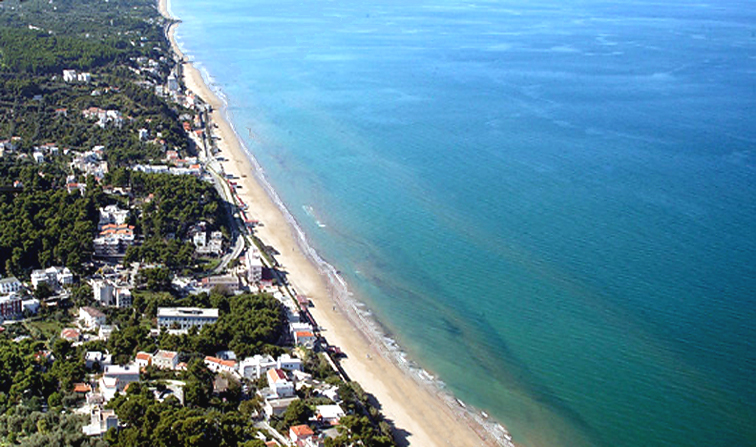
- Aerial view of San Menaio

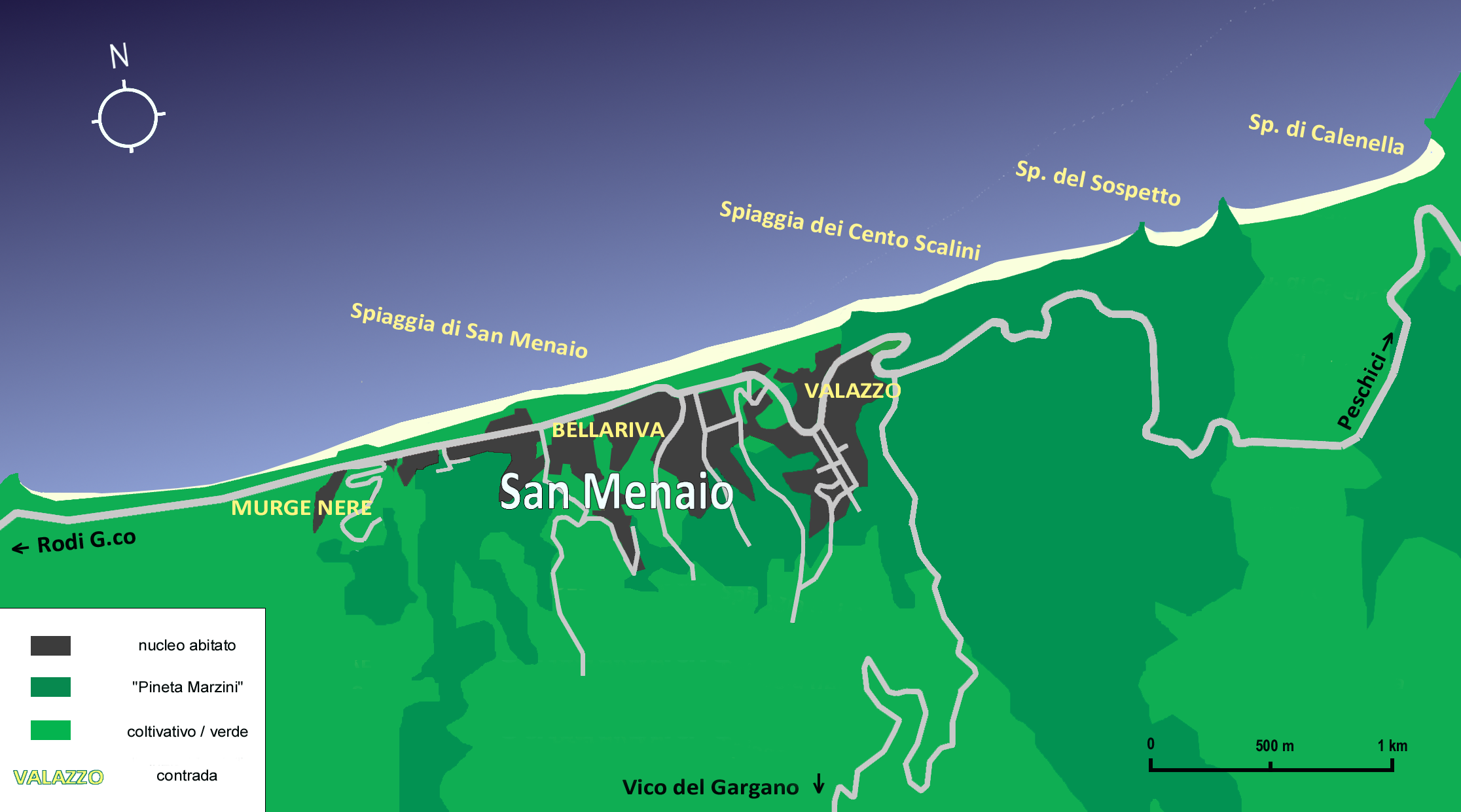
- Map of San Menaio

- Location of San Menaio in Italy
- Coordinates: 41°56′N 15°57′E
- Country: Italy
- Region: Apulia
- Province: Foggia (FG)
- Comune: Vico del Gargano

Area
  - Total: 5.12 km^{2} (1.98 sq mi)
- Elevation: 9 m (30 ft)

Population (1 December 2008)
  - Total: 211
  - Density: 41.2/km^{2} (107/sq mi)
- Demonym: Sanmenaiesi
- Time zone: UTC+1 (CET)
  - Summer (DST): UTC+2 (CEST)
- Postal code: 71018
- Dialing code: (+38) 0884
- Patron saint: Saint Anthony of Padua
- Saint day: 13 June
- Website: Official website

San Menaio (Italian pronunciation: [sam meˈnaːjo]; in Garganic dialect Saint'Mnà [ˌsæɨndə məˈnæː]), also San Menaio Garganico, is a small village and seaside resort, a frazione of the comune of Vico del Gargano in the province of Foggia and the Apulia region of south-east Italy. The 2001 census counted a resident population of 193 (93 males, 100 females) living in 97 family units.

It is a seaside village that lies between Rodi Garganico and Peschici, 6 kilometres north of Vico del Gargano along the coastal route of SS89 freeway.
Known for its long sandy beach and for the forests of Aleppo pines— among the oldest and largest in Italy— which cover the territory and penetrate the village up to the fringes of the beach, it owes its fame in great measure to the early 20th-century writings of Nicola Serena di Lapigio.

== History ==
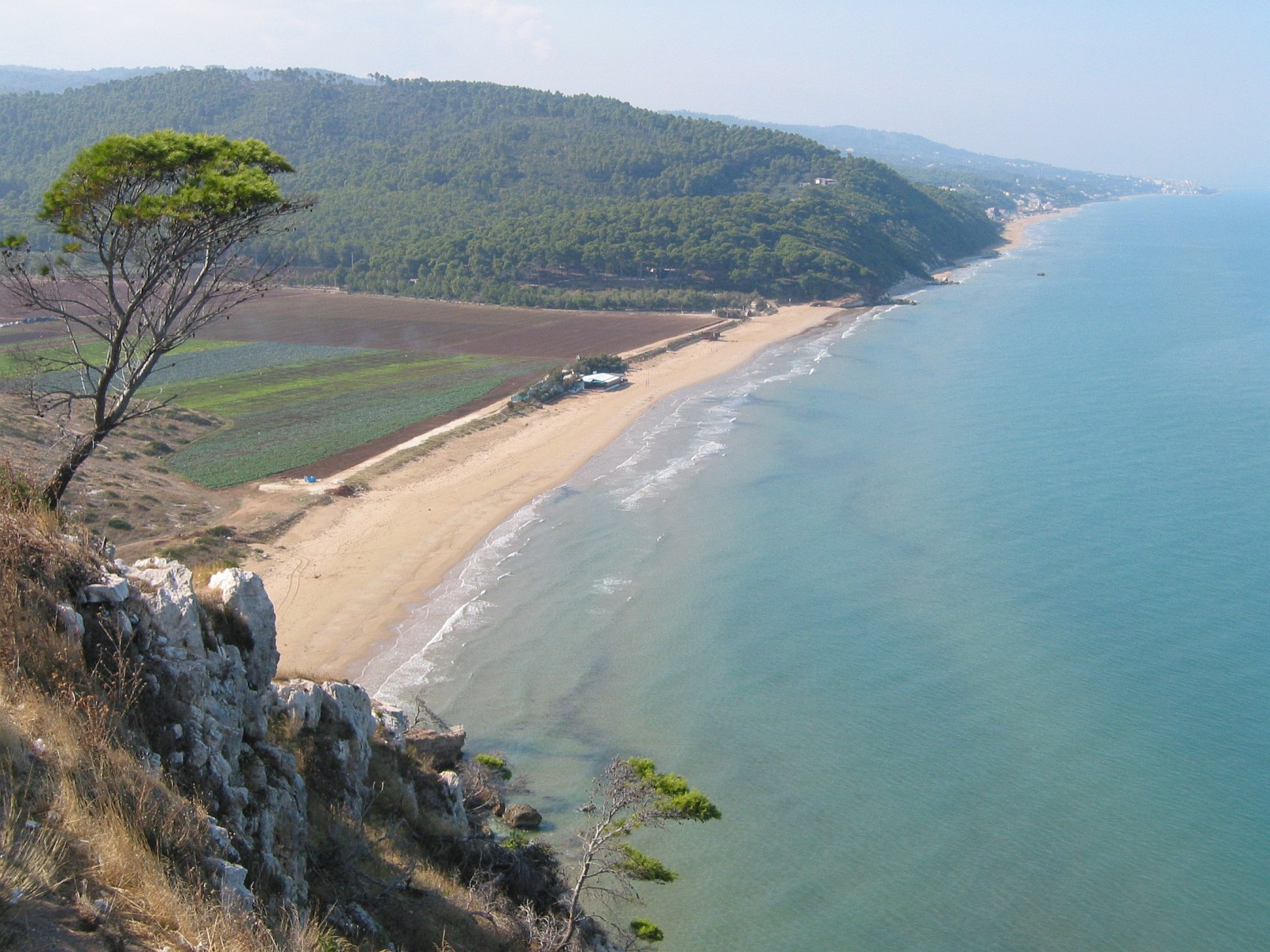
The huge pinewood "Pineta Marzini" between the Calenella Plain and San Menaio

The history of San Menaio is mixed with the mythology that characterizes the folk tradition for centuries in the Gargano area. In ancient age here had spread the cult of Cassandra and of the goddess Mena (from which San Menaio). Tradition tells that it took so much effort by Benedictines first settlements in the area of San Menaio to wipe out idolatry and to change old temples in churches, enlivened with the names of saints and Christian martyrs.

The name of the place is, according to another historical tradition, more widespread and remembered by Giuseppe D'Addetta, to be traced back to the story about the apparition of Saint Menas, an Egyptian warrior, who saved the inhabitants from Saracens attacks.

In the contemporary era San Menaio saw its popularity rapidly increased, especially in the 1960s and 1970s, becoming a place of elegant and exclusive resort and holidays, and passing, unfortunately not without exceptions, through innumerable attempts development abuses that have undermined the sobriety of urban plan, which consists mainly of villas with gardens blend perfectly in the orography of the coast.
In those years Italian artist Andrea Pazienza stays here and finds inspiration from the beauty of this places. San Menaio Eastern Waterfront was recently named in his honour.

== Geography ==
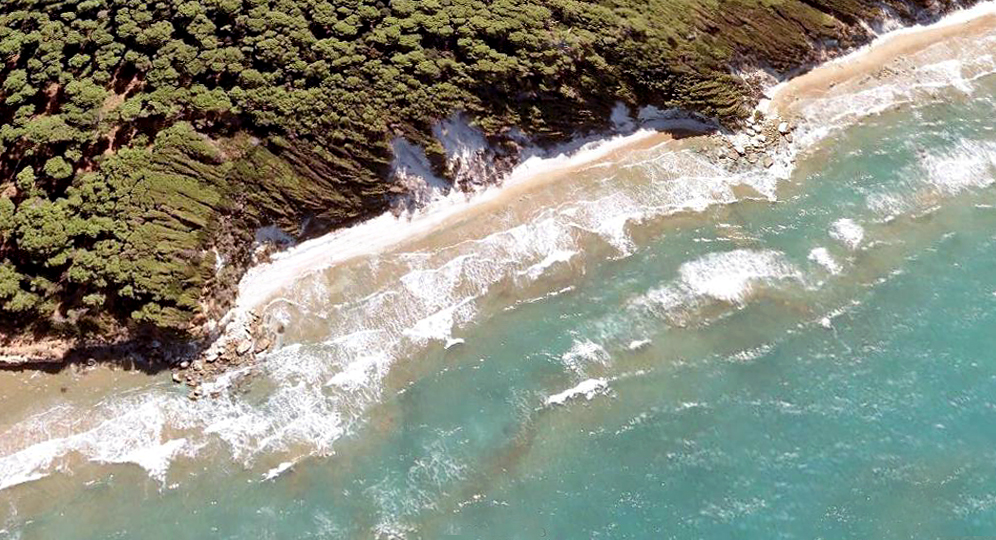
Beach of Sospetto (aerial view)

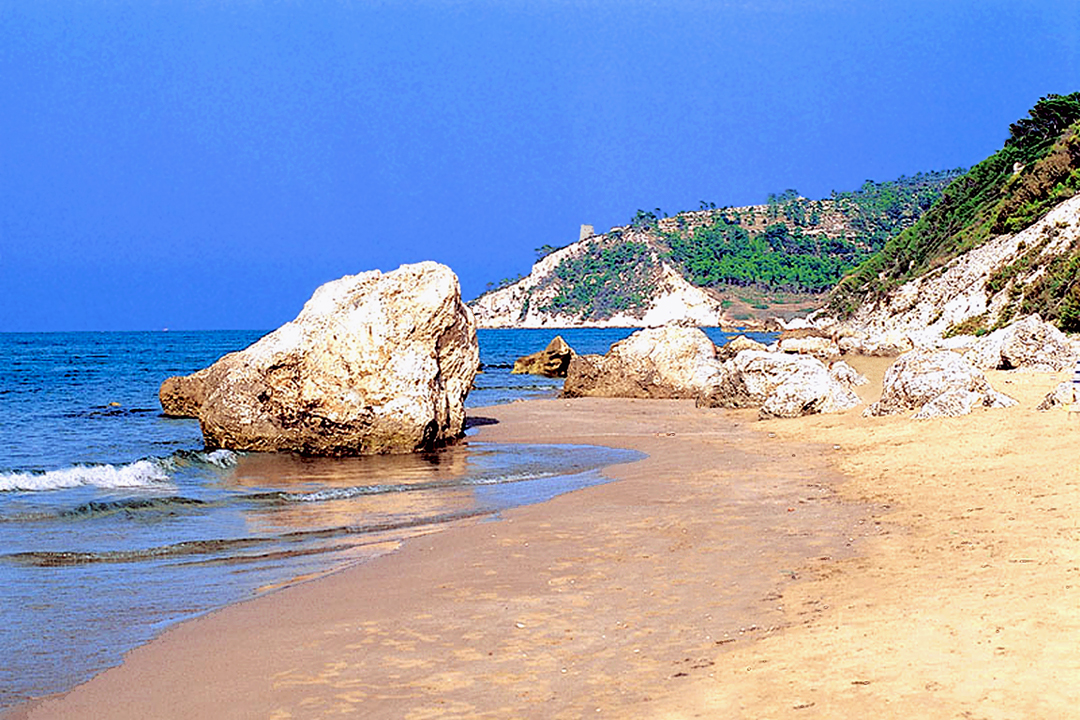
Rocks separating the two beaches of Tufare (also Cento Scalini) and of Sospetto; on background Montepucci promontory.

The town of San Menaio occupies an area nearly three kilometers long and 900 meters wide, developed mainly along the coast from the historical center, built around the river and the medieval tower.

The hilly terrain offers a more linear profile nearby the town and moving along the coast towards East terrain becomes more rough near the district called Valazzo, which marks the eastern boundary of the country. Continuing to east coast rises up to tens of meters and then suddenly become flat at floodplain of Calenella.

The geology of the sites is typically Karst, with sediments fossil dating from Cretaccio and more recent flood plains and beaches at. Hydrography, although minimal in the rest of the Gargano, consists of two short seasonal torrents crossing the country.

Even the flora is not uniform: the coast near the town border with Rodi Garganico presents almost exclusively orange trees (infiltrated by olive inwards); on western side hills are covered by an extensive forest of conifers (Aleppo pine), the Foresta Marzini.

=== Beaches ===
There are four beaches along the coast of San Menaio. All face north-northwest, they are characterized by a fine sandy bottom that has a grain very light and golden color.

==== San Menaio Beach ====
It is a long, typically fine sandy beach, which stretches from west to east for more than 2.5 kilometers from Murge Nere to Valazzo. Wide in some places more than 60 m, is largely equipped and bordered by waterfront.

== Monuments and places of interest ==
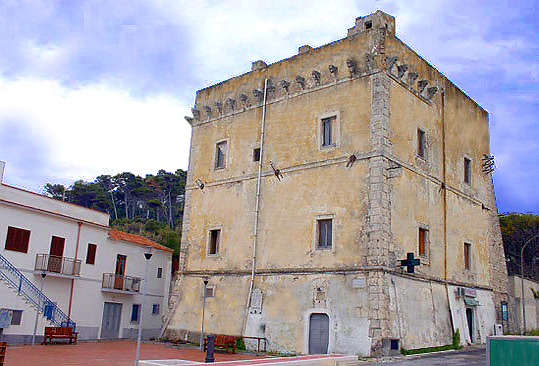
The Torre dei Preposti

Worthy of note is the 14th-century tower called "Torre dei Preposti" (Tower of the Supervisors), a fortress overlooking the sea with functions of defense and customs, which breaks the linearity of the promenade between the old town of San Menaio and the recent residential neighbourhood called "Murge Nere" (Black Rocks) because of the presence of two huge monoliths of dark rock outcropping from shore.

The Church of St. Anthony of San Menaio, simple and austere, dates back to 1600. Situated in a panoramic position, it was converted from a chapel in a parish only in 1894.

== Economy ==
Tourism, the main economic source of the site, has seasonal characteristics, and an international medium-high level target. The sector has received an incentive in 2009 with the opening of the nearby port "Marina di Rodi Garganico". San Menaio is also known for fervent trade citrus DOP "Blonde Orange of Gargano" and "Lemon Femminello of Gargano" with America and European Union.

== Bibliography ==
- Antonio Beltramelli, Il Gargano, 1907
- Giuseppe D'Addetta, San Menaio e dintorni, Foggia, 1947, Santa Croce
- Filippo Fiorentino, La memoria abitata, Napoli, 1998, Alfredo Guida Editore, pp. 128
- Giuseppe de Leonardis, Monografia generale del promontorio Gargano, Napoli, 1858, Stab. poligrafico Pansini
- Nicola Serena di Lapigio, Panorami Garganici, 1934, Casa Editrice "Il Solco", Città di Castello
- Michelangelo Manicone, La Fisica Daunica, 1809 Ed. Storia e Letteratura, Vico del Gargano XXVI-194 pp.
- Domenico Tota, La torre di San Menaio, article on the "Gazzetta di San Severo", October 12, 2002
- Teresa Maria Rauzino, article on the "Corriere del Mezzogiorno - Corriere della sera" of October 30, 2002
