= Giacomo Bellacchi =

Italian mathematician (1838–1924)

- Born: 9 December 1838; Altamura
- Died: 25 February 1924 (aged 85); Florence
- Citizenship: Italian
- Scientific career
- Fields: mathematics

Giacomo Bellacchi (1838–1924) was an Italian mathematician.

After graduating from Scuola Normale Superiore di Pisa, he became a teacher at a military school and at the Tuscan Technical Institute, where one of his pupils was Vito Volterra.

Over his career, he carried out research both in geometry and algebra. He wrote many works, among which the most prominent is probably Introduzione storica alla teoria delle funzioni ellittiche (Historical Introduction to Elliptic Function Theory), which became well known and was used worldwide. He also wrote many university textbooks.

The library of the Fondazione Scienza e Tecnica in Florence has named after him its precious collection of math books and works.

== Bibliography ==
- Bellacchi, Giacomo. Lezioni ed esercizi di algebra. Firenze.
- Bellacchi, Giacomo; Peri, Giuseppe (1873). I principi della geometria moderna esposti da G. Peri e G. Bellacchi. Pistoia.
- Bellacchi, Giacomo (1888). Le applicazioni elementari delle matematiche: discorso letto nel R. Istituto tecnico Galilei il dì 17 di ottobre 1888. Firenze.
- Bellacchi, Giacomo (1891). Galileo e i suoi successori: discorso letto nel R. Istituto tecnico Galilei di Firenze il dì 29 ottobre 1891. Firenze.
- Bellacchi, Giacomo (1891). Teoria dell'equazioni. Firenze.
- Bellacchi, Giacomo (1894). Introduzione storica alla teoria delle funzioni ellittiche. Firenze: Tipografia di G. Barbera.
- Bellacchi, Giacomo (1898). Lezioni ed esercizi di algebra complementare: Fasc. 1. Firenze.
- Bellacchi, Giacomo (1899). Lezioni ed esercizi di algebra complementare: Fasc. 2. Firenze.
- Bellacchi, Giacomo (1910). Complementi di geometria e d'algebra. Firenze.
