= Ottavio Serena =

Italian politician

onorevole Ottavio Serena
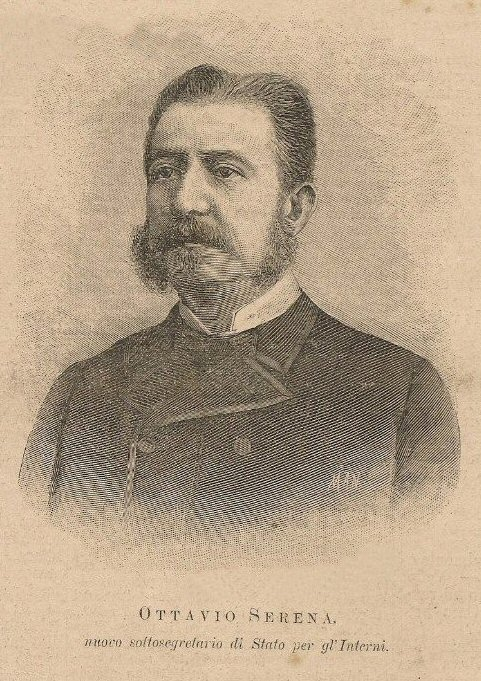
- Ottavio Serena

Deputy of the Chamber of Deputies of the Kingdom of Italy - XII, XIV, XV, XVI, XVIII, XIX and XX legislatures
- Monarch: Umberto I
- Parliamentary group: Destra

Senator of the Kingdom of Italy - XX, XXI legislatures
- Parliamentary group: Destra

Undersecretary of State of Italian Ministry of the Interior
- Prime Minister: Antonio Di Rudinì

Mayor of Altamura
- In office 13 May 1871 – 5 December 1875
- Monarch: Victor Emmanuel II

Ottavio Serena (18 August 1837 – 7 January 1914) was an Italian politician, judge, prefect and historian. He is known in his hometown Altamura for his works about local history, such as the Altamuran Revolution (1799). His contribution and the testimonies he collected allowed to shed light on some historical events (such as the killing of Giovanni Firrao (1799) and on legendary toponyms (Petilia and Altilia).

Moreover, he was one of the promoters of the construction of Acquedotto pugliese ("Apulia waterworks"), which he considered essential for the development of Italian region Apulia.

== Life ==
Ottavio Serena was born in Altamura on 18 August 1837 from a noble local family. The Serena family is supposed to have originated from Monte Sant'Angelo, but they later moved to Foggia. The family owned the fiefdom of Lapigio as early as 1407 with full control over the vassals and with full jurisdiction, as shown on a diploma by queen Joanna II of Naples.

Ottavio Serena graduated in law as well as in literature and philosophy; at the beginning of his career he took care of the reorganization of the education of the Kingdom of the Two Sicilies at the request of Saverio Baldacchini.

During the Risorgimento he was a revolutionary, but, having dedicated his life to research and study, he never fought, unlike many of his friends. Nevertheless, he was no less in the struggle, conspiring under the watchful and suspicious eye of the Bourbon police and he was also member of temporary government established in Altamura, while within walking distance of the city there was a large contingent of the Bourbon army led by general Flores.

After the Unification of Italy (1861), he was relocated to Turin, where he worked as secretary of Italian minister Francesco De Sanctis. He began more and more interested in politics, and, in 1870 he was elected provincial councilor of Bari. In 1874, he was elected as member of the Parliament of the Kingdom of Italy.

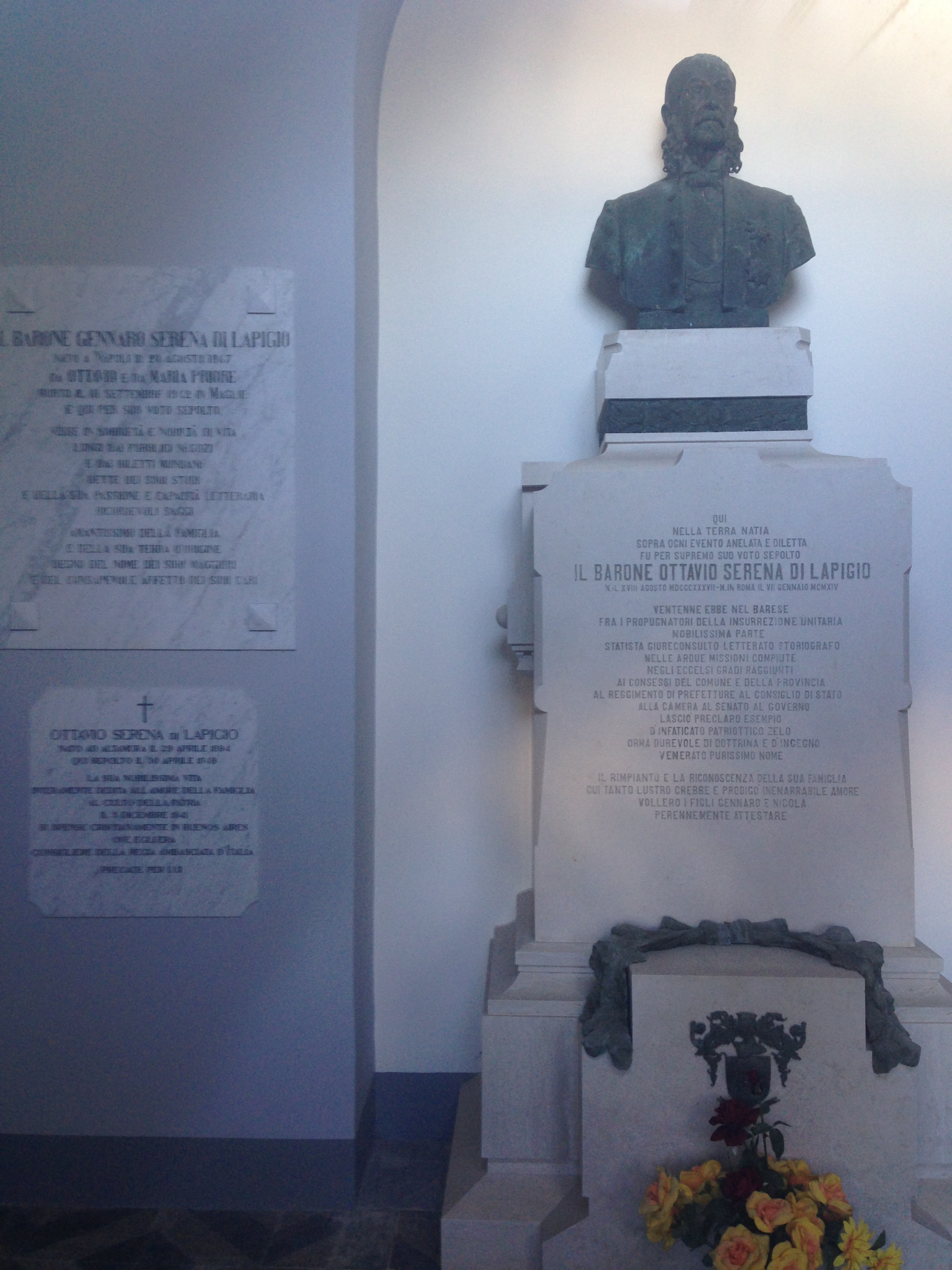
Ottavio Serena's tomb inside Altamura Old Cemetery

In 1888, he was appointed prefect of Pavia, while in 1889, he became prefect of Lecce. In 1898, he was elected Senator of the Kingdom of Italy. In his life, he was also appointed judge, President of Council of State, and he was also mayor of his hometown Altamura (1871-1875). He was elected seven times either in the Chamber of Deputies or in the Italian Senate. After a long life devoted both to politics and the history of his hometown Altamura, Serena died on 7 January 1914 after three years of suffering caused by a disease.

== Works ==
- Ottavio Serena (1855). Per i nuovi fanali a luce elettrica: ode. Napoli: Stamperia del Vaglio.
- Ottavio Serena (1856). A Saverio Baldacchini questi versi dedica l'autore con la speranza di ricever da lui maestro nella divina arte della poesia consigli e conforto. Napoli: Stamperia del Fibreno.
- Ottavio Serena (1859). Su una monografia della città di Altamura: poche osservazioni. Napoli.
- Ottavio Serena (1861). Delle scuole altamurane e di alcune domande e proposte del Sindaco della città di Altamura. Napoli: Tipografia de' Fratelli de Angelis.
- Ottavio Serena (1861). Versi. Naples: Cav. Gaetano Nobile Tipografo-Editore.
- Ottavio Serena (1867). Della città di Amantea e principalmente delle sue nobili famiglie. Napoli: Stamperia della Regia Università.
- Ottavio Serena (1867). Alcuni fatti della rivoluzione del 1799 (lettera del 1862 ad Alexandre Dumas padre). Napoli: Tipografia del Giornale di Napoli (strada Forno vecchio, 2).
- Ottavio Serena (1874). Relazione del cav. Ottavio Serena regio delegato straordinario alla amministrazione comunale di Barletta nella seduta del 29 novembre 1873. Barletta: Tipografia Municipale V. Vecchi.
- Ottavio Serena (1876). Della strada comunale obbligatoria Altamura per Ruvo. Relazione letta al consiglio comunale di Altamura nella tornata del 10 febbraio 1876 dal consigliere Ottavio Serena. Matera: Tipografia Conti.
- Ottavio Serena (1876). La Terraggiera dovuta al comune di Altamura e le usurpazioni ai terreni demaniali del Garagnone: documenti. Altamura: Tipografia del Nuovo Incoraggiamento.
- Ottavio Serena (1877). In morte del senatore cav. Giuseppe Antonacci. Parole pronunziate il dì 23 ottobre 1877 all'associazione costituzionale di Terra di Bari dal comm. Ottavio Serena. Trani: Tipografia Fratelli Fusco.
- Ottavio Serena (1878). La ferrovia Candela-Gioia. Memoria scritta per incarico della giunta municipale di Gioia del Colle dal comm. Ottavio Serena. Altamura: Tipografia Leggieri.
- Ottavio Serena (1878). Commemorazione del re Vittorio Emanuele II fatta in Bari nel teatro Piccinni a di 10 marzo 1878. Barletta: Tipografia V. Vecchi e soci.
- Ottavio Serena (1880). Della consuetudine dotale della città di Altamura. Trani.
- Ottavio Serena (1880). Per lo scoprimento della statua di Massimo D'Azeglio: discorso pronunziato in Barletta il da 17 ottobre 1880 da Ottavio Serena. Barletta: Tipografia Vecchi.
- Ottavio Serena (1881). Discorso del deputato Ottavio Serena pronunziato il giorno 9 gennaio 1881 nel teatro comunale di Gioia dal Colle. Altamura: Tipografia e Cartoleria Leggieri.
- Ottavio Serena (1882). Commemorazione del generale Giuseppe Garibaldi il giorno 17 giugno 1882 in Barletta. Barletta: Tipografia Vecchi.
- Ottavio Serena (1885). La questione dei ratizzi sulle rendite delle opere Pie nelle provincie meridionali. V. Vecchi.
- Ottavio Serena (1885). Sulla legge del riordinamento dell'imposta fondiaria. Discorso del deputato Ottavio Serena pronunciato alla Camera dei deputati nella tornata del 30 novembre 1885. Roma: Tipografia della Camera dei Deputati.
- Ottavio Serena (1887). Delle origini e degli obblighi della fabbriceria dell'Assunta di Altamura: relazione di Ottavio Serena. Altamura: Tipografia Leggieri.
- Ottavio Serena (1887). Di un'antica Università di Studi nelle Puglie. Memorie storiche pubblicate nel 1884 ed ora dall'autore rivedute e corrette. Altamura: Tipografia Leggieri.
- Ottavio Serena (1887). Una lapide del 1316. Trani: Tipografia Vecchi.
- Ottavio Serena (1888). Discorso pronunciato dal deputato Serena nella tornata del 27 febbraio 1888. Roma: Tipografia della Camera dei Deputati.
- Ottavio Serena (1889). Discorso del comm. Ottavio Serena prefetto di Pavia all'apertura della sessione straordinaria 12 marzo 1889 del consiglio Provinciale pubblicato per deliberazione del consiglio medesimo. Pavia: Stabilimento Tipo-Litografico Successori Marelli.
- Ottavio Serena (1891). Discorso del comm. Ottavio Serena all'apertura della sessione straordinaria [del] 27 dicembre 1890 del consiglio provinciale pubblicato per deliberazione del consiglio medesimo. Lecce: Tipografia Scipione Ammirato.
- Ottavio Serena (1895). I musicisti altamurani. Notizie raccolte e pubblicate da Ottavio Serena in occasione del centenario di Saverio Mercadante. Altamura: Tipografia Fratelli Portoghese.
- Ottavio Serena (1895). Per Ruggero Bonghi. In memoria. Sansevero: Tipografia V. De Girolamo.
- Ottavio Serena (1896). Relazione del R. commissario straordinario Ottavio Serena, deputato al parlamento e consigliere di stato, al Consiglio Comunale di Napoli. Napoli: Giannini e figli.
- Ottavio Serena (1898). Discorsi del senatore Ottavio Serena pronunciati in Senato nella tornata del 9 luglio 1898. Roma: Forzani e C. Tipografia del Senato.
- Ottavio Serena (1899). Altamura nel 1799: documenti e cronache inedite. Altamura: Tipografia Fratelli Pansini.
- Ottavio Serena (1900). Altamura (1734-1737). Trani: Tipografia Vecchi.
- Ottavio Serena (1901). Completamento del progetto tecnico dell'Acquedotto pugliese. Discorso del senatore Serena pronunciato in Senato nella tornata del 3 maggio 1901. Roma: Forzani e C. tipografi del Senato.
- Ottavio Serena (1902). La chiesa di Altamura: la serie dei suoi prelati e le sue iscrizioni. V. Vecchi.
- Ottavio Serena. Storia di Altamura (unfinished, contained in Storie inedite della città di Altamura (1985) by Tommaso Berloco).

== See also ==
- Altamura
- Kingdom of Italy

== Sources ==
- Berloco, Tommaso (1985). Storie inedite della città di Altamura. ATA - Associazione Turistica Altamurana Pro Loco.
- AA., VV. (1898). L'Araldo : almanacco nobiliare del napoletano. Vol. 21. Naples: Libreria Detken e Rocholl.
