= Pulo =

Pulo may refer to:

== Places ==
- Pulo, Cabuyao, a village in the Philippines
- Pulo do Lobo, a waterfall in Portugal
- Pulo Gadung, a subdistrict in Jakarta, Indonesia
- Pulo Jehat, an island in Malaysia
- Duri Pulo, Gambir, a village in Indonesia
- Isla Pulo, an island in Metro Manila, Philippines

== Dolines ==
- Pulo di Altamura, Altamura, Apulia, Italy
- Pulo di Molfetta, Molfetta, Apulia, Italy
- Pulicchio di Gravina, Altamura, Apulia, Italy
- Pulicchio di Toritto, Toritto, Bari, Apulia, Italy

== Other uses ==
- Patani United Liberation Organisation, Thailand

== See also ==
- Polo (disambiguation)
