= Murge (disambiguation) =

The Murge is a plateau in Apulia, Italy.

Murge may also refer to:

== Geography ==
- Alta Murgia National Park, Apulia, Italy
- Cassano delle Murge, town in Apulia, Italy
- Minervino Murge, town in Apulia, Italy
- Murgë, mountain peak in the Sharr Mountains, Kosovo

== Military ==
- 14th Field Artillery Group "Murge"
- 23rd Infantry Division "Murge"
- 154th Infantry Division "Murge"

== Other ==
- Roman Catholic Diocese of Minervino Murge
- Murgese, horse breed
