= Niter =

Mineral form of potassium nitrate

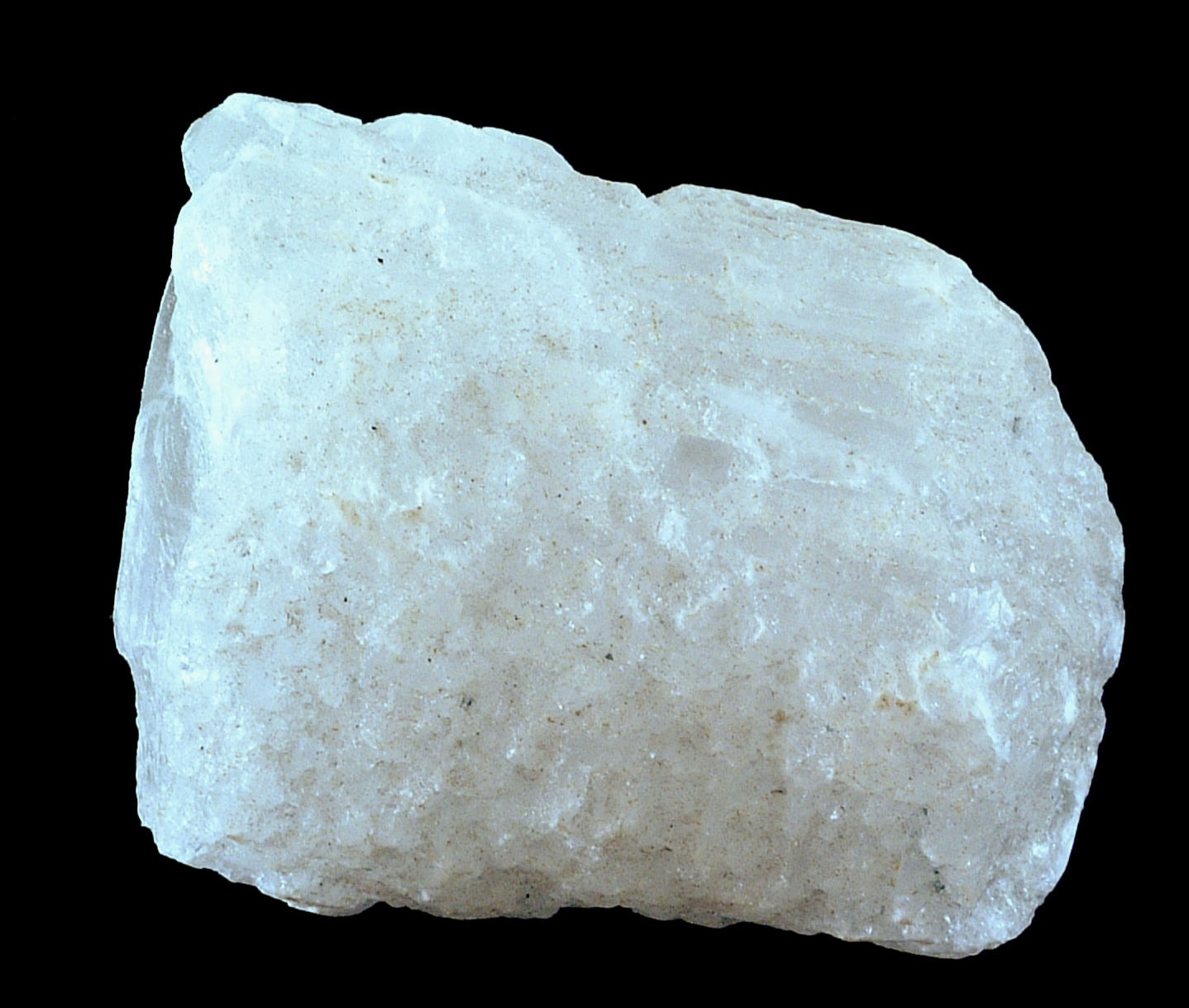
- A piece of niter collected in Tarapaca, Chile

General
- Category: Nitrates, oxide mineral
- Formula: KNO_{3}
- IMA symbol: Nit
- Strunz classification: 5.NA.10
- Dana classification: 18.1.2.1
- Crystal system: Orthorhombic
- Crystal class: Dipyramidal (mmm); H-M symbol: (2/m 2/m 2/m)
- Space group: Cmc2_{1}

Identification
- Color: White
- Crystal habit: Druse or acicular
- Cleavage: Very good on {001}; good on {010}
- Fracture: Brittle
- Mohs scale hardness: 2
- Luster: Vitreous
- Streak: White
- Diaphaneity: Transparent
- Specific gravity: 2.10 (calc.)
- Solubility: Soluble

Niter or nitre is the mineral form of potassium nitrate, KNO_{3}. It is a soft, white, highly soluble mineral found primarily in arid climates or cave deposits.

Potassium and other nitrates are of great importance for use in fertilizers and, historically, gunpowder. Much of the world's demand is now met by synthetically produced nitrates, though the natural mineral is still mined and is still of significant commercial value.

Historically, the term niter was not well differentiated from natron, both of which have been very vaguely defined but generally refer to compounds of sodium or potassium combined with carbonate or nitrate ions.

== Characteristics ==
Niter is a colorless to white mineral crystallizing in the orthorhombic crystal system. It is the mineral form of potassium nitrate, KNO_{3}, and is soft (Mohs hardness 2), highly soluble in water, and easily fusible. Its crystal structure resembles that of aragonite, with potassium replacing calcium and nitrate replacing carbonate. It occurs in the soils of arid regions and as massive encrustations and efflorescent growths on cavern walls and ceilings where solutions containing alkali potassium and nitrate seep into the openings. It occasionally occurs as prismatic acicular crystal groups, and individual crystals commonly show pseudohexagonal twinning on [110]. Niter and other nitrates can also form in association with deposits of guano and similar organic materials.

== History and etymology ==
Niter as a term has been known since ancient times, although there is much historical confusion with natron (an impure sodium carbonate/bicarbonate), and not all of the ancient salts known by this name or similar names in the ancient world contained nitrate. The name is from the Ancient Greek νιτρων nitron from Ancient Egyptian netjeri, related to the Hebrew néter, for salt-derived ashes (their interrelationship is not clear).

The Hebrew néter may have been used as, or in conjunction, with soap, as implied by Jeremiah 2:22, "For though thou wash thee with niter, and take thee much soap..." However, it is not certain which substance (or substances) the Biblical "neter" refers to, with some suggesting sodium carbonate.

The Neo-Latin word for sodium, natrium, is derived from this same class of desert minerals called natron (French) through Spanish natrón from Greek νίτρον (nitron), derived from Ancient Egyptian netjeri, referring to the sodium carbonate salts occurring in the deserts of Egypt, not the nitratine (nitrated sodium salts) typically occurring in the deserts of Chile (classically known as "Chilean saltpeter" and variants of this term).

A term (ἀφρόνιτρον, aphronitron or aphronitre) which translates as "foam of niter" was a regular purchase in a fourth-century AD series of financial accounts, and since it was expressed as being "for the baths" was probably used as soap.

Niter was used to refer specifically to nitrated salts known as various types of saltpeter (only nitrated salts were good for making gunpowder) by the time niter and its derivative nitric acid were first used to name the element nitrogen, in 1790.

== Availability ==
Because of its ready solubility in water, niter is most often found in arid environments and often in conjunction with other soluble minerals like halides, iodates, borates, gypsum, and rarer carbonates and sulphates.

Niter occurs naturally in certain places like the "Caves of Salnitre" (Collbató) known since the Neolithic. In the "Cova del Rat Penat", guano (bat excrements) deposited over thousands of years became saltpeter after being leached by the action of rainwater.

In 1783, Giuseppe Maria Giovene and Alberto Fortis together discovered a "natural nitrary" in a doline close to Molfetta, Italy, named Pulo di Molfetta. The two scientists discovered that niter formed inside the walls of the caves of the doline, under certain conditions of humidity and temperature. After the discovery, it was suggested that manure could be used for agriculture, in order to increase the production, rather than to make gunpowder. The discovery was challenged by scholars until chemist Giuseppe Vairo and his pupil Antonio Pitaro confirmed the discovery. Naturalists sent by academies from all Europe came in large number to visit the site; since niter is a fundamental ingredient in the production of gunpowder, these deposits were of considerable strategic interest. The government started extraction. Shortly thereafter, Giovene discovered niter in other caves of Apulia. The remnants of the extraction plant is a site of industrial archaeology, although currently not open to tourists.

== Similar minerals ==
Related minerals are soda niter (sodium nitrate), ammonia niter or gwihabaite (ammonium nitrate), nitrostrontianite (strontium nitrate), nitrocalcite (calcium nitrate), nitromagnesite (magnesium nitrate), nitrobarite (barium nitrate) and two copper nitrates, gerhardtite and buttgenbachite; in fact all of the natural elements in the first three columns of the periodic table and numerous other cations form nitrates which are uncommonly found for the reasons given, but have been described. Niter was used to refer specifically to nitrated salts known as various types of saltpeter (only nitrated salts were good for making gunpowder) by the time niter and its derivative nitric acid were first used to name the element nitrogen, in 1790.

== See also ==
- Caliche – Calcium carbonate based concretion of sediment
- Nitratine - Sodium based fertilizer
