= Carmelo Colamonico =

Italian geographer, geologist and scholar

Vito Carmelo Colamonico
- Born: 27 July 1882; Acquaviva delle Fonti
- Died: 31 December 1973; Naples
- Occupations: Geographer; geologist; scholar

Vito Carmelo Colamonico (Colamonaco) (27 July 1882 – 31 December 1973) was an Italian geographer, geologist and scholar. His works include studies on some karst dolines and landforms of Italy, such as Pulo di Altamura, Pulicchio di Gravina and Gurio Lamanna.

== Biography ==
Carmelo Colamonico was born in Acquaviva delle Fonti, in the historic city center, near the church of Sant'Agostino. He attended the classical lyceum in Gioia del Colle, with historian Antonio Lucarelli as a literature teacher.

He graduated in Italian literature at the University of Naples in 1905 with a dissertation on Apulia's geography. During his university years, he became an assistant to Professor Filippo Porena, one of the most prominent geographers at that time, who encouraged him because of his intelligence.

After returning from Naples, he actively participated in the social and political life of the town, becoming a councilor for public education. He taught in the classical lyceum of Gioia del Colle and some technical schools of Bari, Foggia, and Naples.

In 1922, he won the competition and obtained the chair of Economic Geography at Istituto Superiore di Scienze economiche e Commerciali di Bari (which would later become the Faculty of Economics at the University of Bari). On 15 October 1923, he married Anna Maria Pellerano, with whom he had two daughters, Maria and Caterina, and he settled in Cassano delle Murge.

In 1927, he moved to Naples where he taught geography at the university until 1952 and for ten years he was also dean of the Faculty of Italian Literature.

At the same time he taught Colonial Geography at the Università degli Studi "L'Orientale" and in Suor Orsola Benincasa University of Naples. Between 1947 and 1954 he was a member of Italy's National Council of Education, became president of Accademia Pontaniana and (since 1963) he was also a member of the Lincean Academy, became a member of honor of Italian Geographical Society, of the Apulian Academy of Sciences and of the National Society of Sciences, Arts and Letters, located in Naples. He also contributed to the Institute of the Italian Treccani Encyclopedia, and he held the position of director of the institute of Economic Geography at National Research Council (CNR). He was also president of the National Committee for Italy's Map of land use, as well as director of the Meteorological Observatory in Bari; moreover, between 1963 and 1965 he was a member of Italy's Superior Council of Academies and Libraries. He continued his research activity until 1971; he died two years later at Naples.

== Scientific research ==
In 1908, at the age of 25, he began publishing geographic works, among which it is worth to cite Studi corologici sulla Puglia. In 1910 he participated in the VII Italian Geographical Congress held in Palermo, where he was noted for his first studies on Apulia's karst morphology and underground hydrography.

He studied Apulia's hydrogeological phenomena and collected the results inside Le acque sotterranee in Puglia, published in 1913. After two years he published another work titled La pioggia in Campania, published inside journal Memorie Geografiche and it was the result of his studies on rainfall of the Italian Campania region.

He also became interested in cartography and in 1921 he published Gli appunti storici sulla cartografia della Puglia. He also became interested in agricultural and economic geography by publishing an article on the distribution of crops in the province of Bari in 1922.

In 1926 he completed his research, begun in 1916, on the karst morphology of Apulia's soil, during which he had analyzed Pulo di Altamura, Pulicchio di Gravina, Gurio Lamanna and other karst landforms. In the same year, he wrote the introduction on the karst phenomenon chapter for volume Duemila grotte published by Touring Club Italiano. In 1930 he arranged the XI Italian Geographic Congress in Naples and published four volumes of proceedings. From 1932 he began to study the various forms of dwelling present in the Murgia region, noting the importance of the frequency of rainfall for human settlements.

In 1939 he illustrated the oldest regional map of Apulia published in 1567 by Giacomo Gastaldi. One of his most prominent works is "Italy's agricultural land use map" (1956) (Italian: Carta agraria di utilizzazione del suolo d'Italia), which stemmed from a collective work of which he was the director, and which includes 26 large-scale maps described in 18 volumes of memories and where Italy's vegetation coverage is shown. This work had international recognition and Colamonico illustrated it at international geography meetings held in Stockholm and Washington, D.C.

He was also very sensitive to education issues and he gave a rich personal contribution with works such as Le carte geografiche e Le carte storiche in 1942 and books about geography teaching, such as Lezioni di geografia fisica, written in 1948 and Sommario di storia della geografia written in 1956. He also wrote textbooks that were used in Italian high schools.

He also organized the XVII Italian Geographical Congress in Bari during 1957, while between 1925 and 1960 he published studies on the geographical distribution of crops, which terminated with his last work in this field: Memoria illustrativa della carta della utilizzazione del suolo della Puglia (1960).

In sixty-five years of research, he published over 200 works, most of which were about Southern Italy, Apulia's karst morphology, karst landforms and groundwater hydrography.

== Sources ==
- Elio Migliorini, Carmelo Colamonico in «Bollettino della Società geografica italiana», 1974, fasc. 1-6, pp. 1–20;
- R. Riccardi, Carmelo Colamonico, Roma 1976 (discorso commemorativo pronunciato nella seduta ordinaria del 10 gennaio 1976 dell'Accademia dei Lincei con ampia bibliografia delle opere di Colamonico);
- Maria Beatrice D'Ambrosio, «COLAMONICO, Carmelo», in Dizionario Biografico degli Italiani, vol. 26, Istituto dell'Enciclopedia italiana Treccani, Roma, 1982, pp. 693–695;
- Giuseppe Morandini, «COLAMONICO, Carmelo», Enciclopedia Italiana - II Appendice (1948)
- D. Ruocco, Carmelo Colamonico, difensore della Geografia e docente entusiasta nei ricordi di un vecchio scolaro, in «La Geografia nelle Scuole», 1983, pp. 154–160;

== See also ==
- Pulo di Altamura
- Pulicchio di Gravina
- Pulo di Molfetta
- Gurio Lamanna
- Lama (geology)
