= Saltpetre works =

Place of production of potassium nitrate or saltpetre

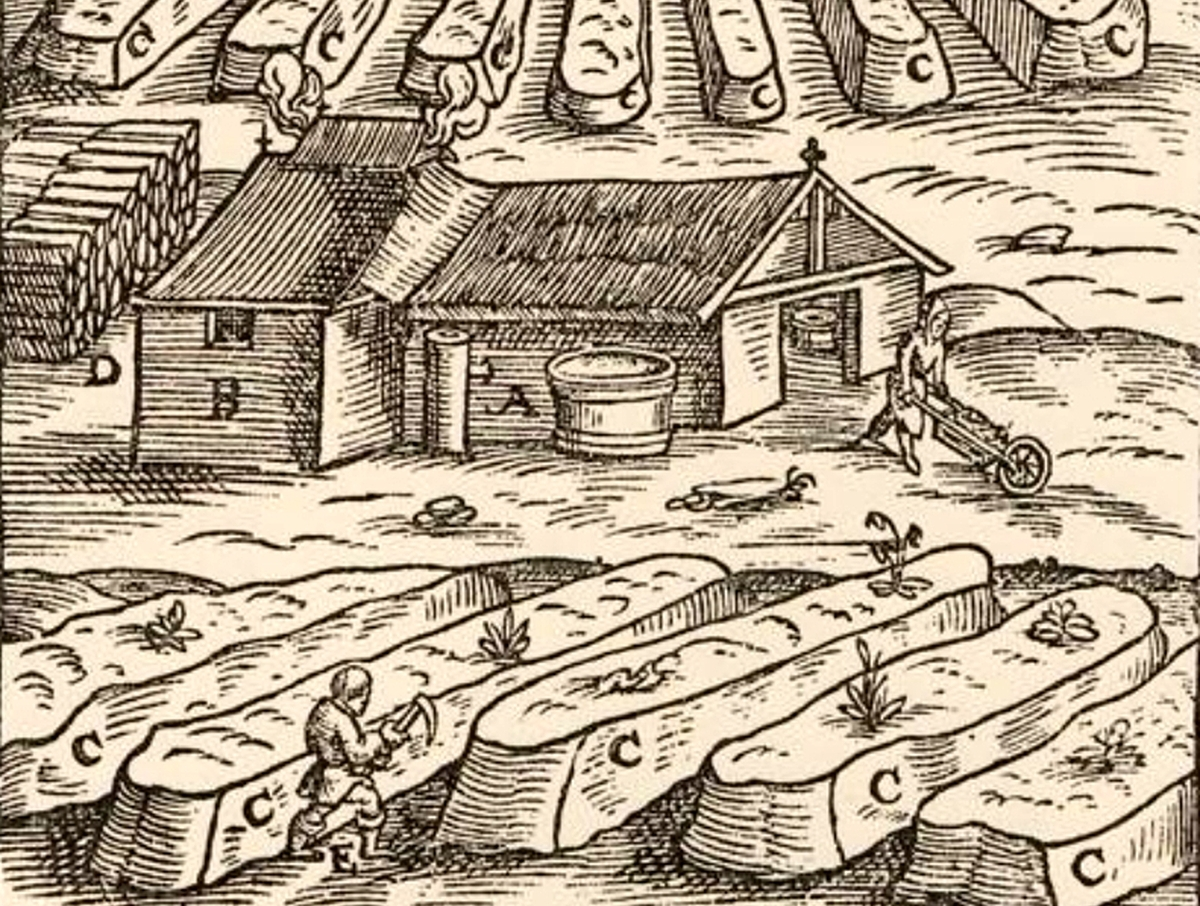
A typical nitrary (Germany, circa 1580) with leaching deposits (C) filled with decaying vegetal material mixed with manure. A worker collects effloresced saltpeter from deposits, transporting it then to be concentrated in the factory (A) boilers.

A saltpetre works or nitrary is a place of production of potassium nitrate or saltpetre used primarily for the manufacture of gunpowder. The saltpeter occurs naturally in certain places like the "Caves of Salnitre" (Collbató) known since the Neolithic. In the "Cova del Rat Penat", guano (in this case, bat excrements) deposited over thousands of years became saltpeter after being leached by the action of rainwater.

== Manufacture ==
Saltpeter Mine Ruins in Mammoth Cave

The process involved burial of excrements (human or animal) in the fields prepared for that purpose beside the nitraries, watering them and waiting until the leaching process did its job; after a certain time, operators gathered the saltpeter that "came out" to the ground surface by efflorescence. Then they transported it to be concentrated by ebullition in the boiler plant.

== History ==
Besides "Montepellusanus", during the thirteenth century (and beyond) the only supply of saltpeter across Christian Europe (according to "De Alchimia" in 3 manuscripts of Michael Scot, 1180–1236) was "found in Spain in Aragonia in a certain mountain near the sea", (which can only be Catalonia): saraceni apellant ipsum borax et credunt quod sit alumen. Et in Hispania invenitur versus Argoniam in quodam monte juxta mare. et apellant ipsum hispani alumen acetum activum.

In fact in 1561, Elizabeth I of England at war with Philip II of Spain, became unable to import the saltpeter (of which the Kingdom of England had no home production), and had to pay "300 pounds gold" to the German captain Gerrard Honrik for the manual "Instructions for making salpeter to growe" (the secret of the "Feuerwerkbuch" -the nitraries-).

In 1783, Giuseppe Maria Giovene and Alberto Fortis together discovered a "natural nitrary" in a doline close to Molfetta, Italy, whose name is Pulo di Molfetta. The two scientists discovered that saltpeter formed inside the walls of the caves of the doline, under certain conditions of humidity and temperature. Prior to the discovery, nitraries were widespread all over the Kingdom of Naples. Manure was collected by the government and used to make saltpeter, which was a key ingredient for gunpowder. After the discovery, it was suggested that manure could be used for agriculture, in order to increase the production, rather than to make gunpowder.

The discovery also generated issues; in particular, it was initially challenged by some scholars. Subsequently, chemist Giuseppe Vairo and his pupil Antonio Pitaro confirmed the discovery. This undoubtedly damaged producers of artificial saltpetre, and some scholars, most likely supported by the producers, tried to dismiss the discovery. Following the above discovery, naturalists sent by academies from all Europe came in large number to visit Pulo di Molfetta, since the saltpeter was a fundamental ingredient in the production of gunpowder and these deposits were of considerable strategic interest.

Soon, the government started to extract saltpetre from Pulo di Molfetta and today the doline still contains the remains of the ancient plant used to extract saltpetre, making it a site of industrial archaeology. Pulo di Molfetta is currently not open to tourists.

Shortly thereafter, Giuseppe Maria Giovene discovered that saltpetre also formed in other caves of Apulia.

== See also ==
- Bernard Courtois, who operated a Salpetriere or nitrary and discovered iodine.
- History of gunpowder in Catalonia
- Nitrate of Chile
- Humberstone and Santa Laura Saltpeter Works
- Caliche

== Bibliography ==
- Pietro Filioli (1837). "Necrologia – Giuseppe Maria Giovene – Arciprete della Cattedrale Chiesa di Molfetta". Annali Civili del Regno delle Due Sicilie. 25, gennaio e febbraio. Tipografia del Real Ministero degli Affari Interni nel Reale Albergo de' Poveri.
- Andrea Tripaldi (1841). "Elogio storico del canonico arciprete Giuseppe Maria Giovene". Memorie di Matematica e di Fisica della Società Italiana delle Scienze Residente in Modena. 22. Modena: Tipi della R. D. Camera.
- Giuseppe Maria Giovene (7 August 1784). Lettera del Sig. canonico D. Giuseppe Maria Giovene, Vicario generale di Molfetta, al Sig. Abate Alberto Fortis, contenente varie osservazioni sulla nitrosità naturale della Puglia. Molfetta.
