= Steven Seidenberg =

- Born: 1967
- Occupations: Photographer, author
- Notable work: The Architecture of Silence: Abandoned Lives of the Italian South (2023); Pipevalve:Berlin (2017); Anon (2022); Plain Sight (2020); Situ (2018)
- Website: www.stevenseidenberg.com

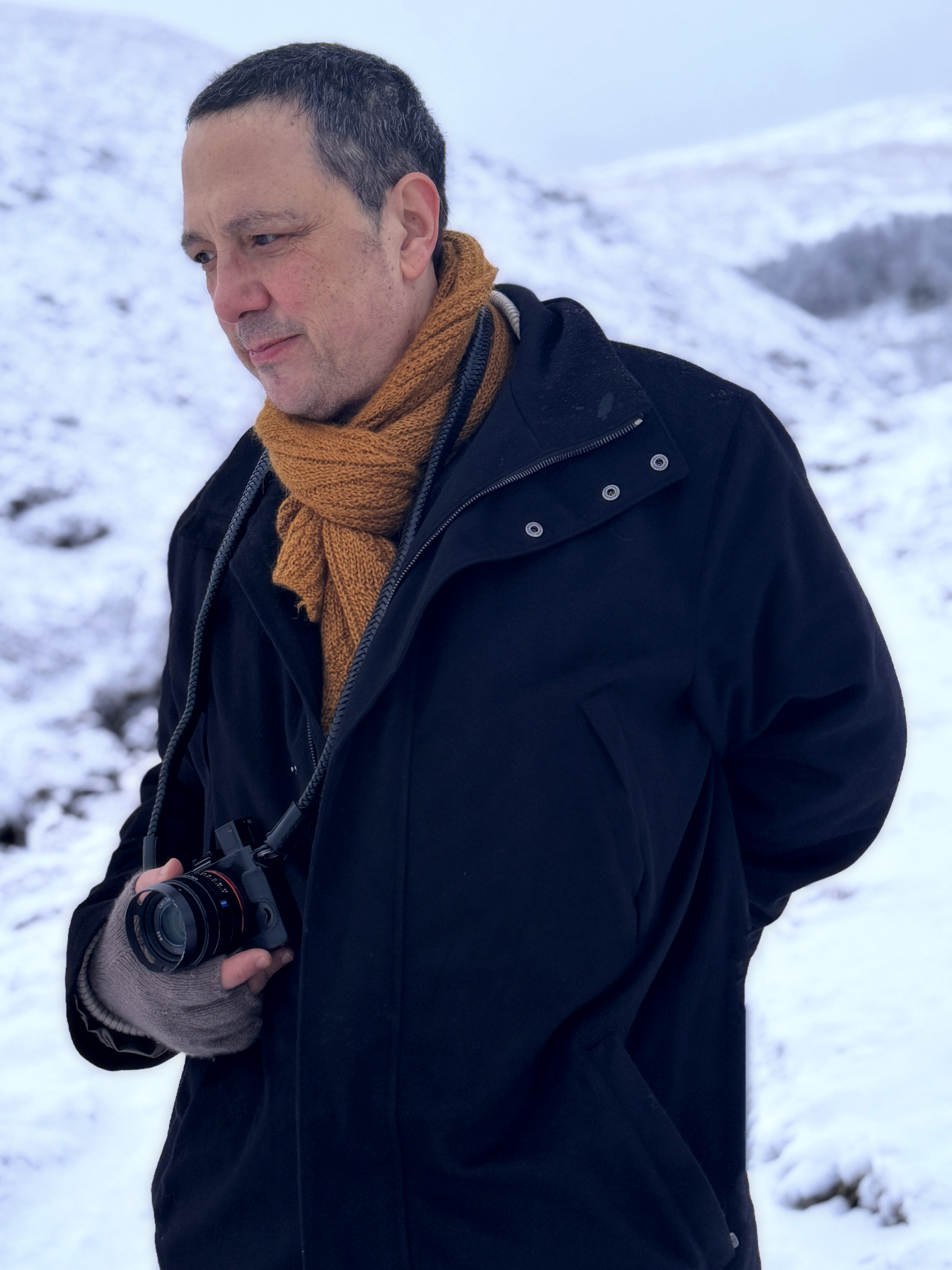

Steven Seidenberg (born 1967) is an American photographer and author. His work combines photography, philosophy, and poetry, often exploring themes of memory, isolation, and the human condition. Notable works include The Architecture of Silence: Abandoned Lives of the Italian South and Anon. Seidenberg has had solo exhibitions in various countries, including Italy, Japan, Germany, Mexico, and the United States.

== Background ==
Seidenberg was born in 1967. He currently resides in San Francisco, California. Seidenberg pursued studies in philosophy, which influences his artistic approach.

In interviews, Seidenberg has cited photographer Lynne Cohen as an artist who influenced his work.

== Photography ==
Seidenberg's photography focuses on abandoned spaces, capturing details that reveal the character of former inhabitants through objects and modifications left behind. His early solo exhibition, Tokyo Tape (2016), documented tape used in Tokyo subway stations for directional and cautionary purposes. The series, displayed at 3331 Gallery in Tokyo, featured large color prints highlighting these minimalist elements.

In 2017, Seidenberg's Pipevalve: Berlin exhibition at Laconia Gallery in Boston showcased photographs of a form of cast-iron fitting he discovered during a residency in Berlin.

His most notable work, The Architecture of Silence: Abandoned Lives of the Italian South (2023), examines abandoned sites from Italy's post-war land reform movement, the Riforma Fondiaria (1952–1972). This series has been exhibited internationally, including in Rome, Japan, Italy, Germany, Mexico, and the United States. A review from Barry Schwabsky of Border Crossings notes that Seidenberg's The Architecture of Silence: Abandoned Lives of the Italian South depict abandoned spaces that, while devoid of people, still seem inhabited by traces of former occupants. He highlights Seidenberg's approach, described by the artist as "laborious circumspection," in searching for visual evidence to construct a larger sequence of images. Schwabsky describes this approach as "an unusual and productive way of handling the dialectic of picturing and writing."

The publication of this work was accompanied by Distant Voices: On Steven Seidenberg’s Architecture of Silence, a collection of essays edited by anthropologist Carolyn L. White, featuring analysis from various academic perspectives.

During his work in Italy, Seidenberg also documented a migrant camp run by Baobab Experience, an aid organization in Rome assisting refugees with integration. The camp had to relocate several times due to evictions and was ultimately cleared by authorities in November 2018. Before the camp's demolition, Seidenberg photographed its location at Piazzale Maslax in 2018.

In 2023, Seidenberg, along with Carolyn White, was invited to participate in a collaborative project focused on the rural architecture of Alta Murgia Park in Italy. Seidenberg's work on The Architecture of Silence is set to be featured in exhibitions, talks, and photography workshops as part of this project, which involves the Park Authority and the Esperimenti Architettonici association. The initiative coincides with the park's 20th anniversary in 2024.

== Literature ==
Seidenberg has published several collections of literary works, including Itch (Raw Art Press, 2014) Situ (Black Sun Lit, 2018), Plain Sight (Roof Books, 2020), and Anon (Omnidawn, 2022).

His 2014 experimental novel Itch explores existential and epistemological themes through the protagonist's perception of an incessant itch. A review from Colorado State University noted that the novel "offers readers a vision of the novel's future, and its history," eschewing conventional storytelling elements.

Situ (2018) is a philosophical text that blends satire and introspection, following an unnamed entity's dialogue with itself and a bench. Micah Zevin of Heavy Feather Review described the work as linguistically and structurally poetic, consisting of short essays that investigate the complexities of self and reality. Situ has been translated into Italian.

Plain Sight (2020) is a collection that explores concepts of thinking and being through a series of propositions about life, thought, and perception. The work combines philosophical inquiry with poetic language, described by Laura Moriarty as an "excavation of the nous," and by Carla Harryman as "an epic recasting of philosophical language." It employs various rhetorical devices to challenge common illusions and perceptions. Plain Sight has been translated into Portuguese, with a selection also translated into Swedish.

Anon, a collection of poems published in 2022, combines introspective confession with philosophical critique. In a review from Jacket2, Mae Losasso describes the work as "a textual mountebank," referring to Seidenberg's use of wordplay, storytelling, and unconventional techniques to engage readers. Anon's aphoristic style has drawn comparisons to Samuel Beckett, Clarice Lispector, and Maurice Blanchot. Author Cole Swensen described Seidenberg's work as "a tour de force of linguistic imagination."

In November 2026, Seidenberg was a guest on the Off the Shelf podcast.

== Selected works ==
=== Solo exhibitions ===
- 2024, Officine Fotografiche Roma, Rome, Italy
- 2023, Uncentered Paradigm, Festival of the Periphery, Rome, Italy
- 2023, MAAM's Prayer Room (Museum of Other and Elsewhere), Rome, Italy
- 2022, Off Main Gallery, Wellfleet, MA
- 2021, Right Window Gallery, San Francisco, CA
- 2018, Hartnett Gallery, University of Rochester, Rochester, NY
- 2017, Laconia Gallery, Boston, MA
- 2016, 3331 Gallery, Tokyo, Japan

=== Group exhibitions ===
- 2017, Photo LA, Lodima Press, Los Angeles, CA
- 2016, Museum of Kyoto, Kyoto, Japan
- 2013, Tapir Gallery, Berlin, Germany
- 2013, GlogauAIR, Berlin, Germany

=== Books ===
==== Photography ====
- White, Carolyn, ed. (2023). The Architecture of Silence: Abandoned Lives of the Italian South. Contrasto. ISBN 978-88-6965-890-7.
- White, Carolyn, ed. (2023-04-04). Distant Voices: On Steven Seidenberg's the ARCHITECTURE of SILENCE. Contrasto DUE. ISBN 978-88-6965-896-9.
- Seidenberg, Steven J. (2017). Pipevalve: Berlin : Photographs and Writing. Lodima Press. ISBN 978-1-888899-87-0.

==== Philosophy and poetry ====
- —— (2022). Anon. Omnidawn Publishing. ISBN 978-1-63243-105-9.
- ——; Brown, Brandon (2020). Plain Sight. Roof Books. ISBN 978-1-931824-86-6.
- —— (2018). Situ. Black Sun Lit. ISBN 978-0-9994312-1-4.
- —— (2014). Itch. RAW ArT PRESS. ISBN 978-0-9819534-5-8.
