= Giuseppe Maria Giovene =

Italian scientist

- Born: 23 January 1753; Molfetta, Italy
- Died: 2 January 1837 (aged 83); Molfetta, Italy
- Resting place: Church of Saint Conrad of Bavaria – Molfetta, Italy; 41.206316°N 16.597722°E
- Citizenship: Kingdom of Naples; Kingdom of the Two Sicilies
- Occupations: archpriest, naturalist, agronomist, geologist, meteorologist, entomologist and ichthyologist

Giuseppe Maria Giovene (23 January 1753 – 2 January 1837) was an Italian archpriest, naturalist, agronomist, geologist, meteorologist, entomologist and ichthyologist. He is best known for his studies on the "nitrosity" of Pulo di Molfetta, which made him famous abroad, so as to be cited and appreciated by many Italian and foreign scholars, including Eberhard August Wilhelm von Zimmermann.

His scientific research, mainly focused agronomy, botany and meteorology, were not just theoretical and aimed at the mere research of natural phenomena, but their goal was to develop and improve agriculture in the Kingdom of Naples; this was a common feature of the scientific works of the earliest scientists of the Kingdom of Naples. He was member of many academies, among which the Società italiana delle scienze and, because of his being a polymath, he's been described as an "encyclopaedic mind".

He was also a clergyman, and he held many important positions, including those of archpriest and apostolic vicar. He also became interested in numismatics, and he collected ancient coins and medallions, and he also possessed a collection of ancient Italo-Greek vases (called etruschi). He was also a spirit devoted to charity and modesty, so much that sometimes he preferred not to publish his articles, which were published by his colleagues, such as abbot Ciro Saverio Minervini.

He was one of the first scientists of Apulia and he exhibited remarkable scientific skills, helping to eradicate "the prejudice against the good Apulian people of their being lazy and ignorant." His research activity was carried out using modern methods of observation and experimentation, "following the maxims of Galileo". "He liked to read the observations carried out by others, but he also liked to see the whole procedure with his own eyes".

== Life ==
=== Early life ===
Giuseppe Maria Giovene was born in Molfetta on 23 January 1753, son to Giovanni Giovene and Antonia Graziosi. His father, before dying, entrusted him to the bishop of Molfetta Celestino Orlandi, who instructed him up to the age of 8 and subsequently he studied with Jesuit clerics, who then lived in the Gran Collegio di Molfetta. Giovene studied there until the age of 12. In 1766, he went to Rome where he was admitted to the Jesuit novitiate, although he wasn't old enough, but after only eight months the Jesuit order was suppressed and the Jesuits expelled from the Kingdom of Naples. Giovene wanted to follow the Jesuits abroad but he couldn't because of an illness.

During his childhood, he showed he did not love "juvenile amusements" and he preferred to adiscuss with learned men. When he returned to Molfetta after recovering from his illness, he studied philosophy and mathematics in the seminary of Molfetta under the direction of bishop Celestino Orlandi. Among other things he also studied law, and, as a boy, he began to show a predisposition for the natural sciences. He went to Naples, when he was only a cleric, and was recommended to Ciro Saverio Minervini and there he met learned and famous naturalists, such as Vincenzo Petagna. He also loved to discuss with his fellow citizens and naturalists, Giuseppe Saverio Poli and Ciro Saverio Minervini.

=== Return to Molfetta ===
In 1773, he returned to Molfetta, and the bishop of Molfetta who had instructed him, Celestino Orlandi, wanted him to become a priest of the parish of the Church of Saint Stephen, in Molfetta. Despite Giovene's resistance, the bishop eventually forced him to participate in the parish priest's selection contest, which Giovene won. At that moment, however, Celestino Orlandi, his childhood tutor, died, and at that time he wrote the funeral praise Orazione pei solenni funerali di D. Celestino Orlandi (1775).

In the meantime, Gennaro Antonucci was appointed as new bishop of Molfetta, who wanted him to be his apostolic vicar, probably because of his fame or his experience. Meanwhile, Giovene did not despise to help the poor, orphans, offering them free legal advice to protect against the abuses of the powerful. At that time, he was also in charge of teaching law at the Molfetta seminary. In order to become a vicar, he had to be a graduate, and thus he went to Naples to fulfill his duties. Once there, he took the chance to discuss with the scholars about art and natural history. Despite his many commitments, he always found time to devote himself to natural history. He was also appointed archpriest of the former Molfetta Cathedral.

=== The year 1799 ===
During the Parthenopean Republic (1799), Giovene's friend Giuseppe Saverio Poli followed king Ferdinand IV of Naples to Sicily, and he entrusted to Giovene his house, his library, his tools and everything he owned. Giovene could not prevent the depredation made by force by some pro-French officers of the short-lived Parthenopean Republic. Many rare samples of natural history, such as "the wax tablets of the testaceous", ended up in the Paris Academy of Sciences.

=== The vicariate in Lecce and his return to Molfetta ===
His fame reached as far as pope Pius VII, who chose him for the diocese of Lecce. Giovene did not want to accept that further burden, but his refusal was not considered, thus he was appointed apostolic vicar of Lecce from about 1806 to 1816. In this period, he was also appointed capitular vicar of Otranto and Oria and he turned out to rule over most of the churches in the Province of Lecce.

In 1817, he returned to Molfetta, wishing to be able to enjoy a quiet, peaceful life, but he was immediately assigned new tasks. He was also apostolic vicar of the bishop of Molfetta Gennaro Antonucci, successor to the bishop Celestino Orlandi.

Alongside the study of science, he also cultivated numismatics, collecting coins and medallions of all kinds, and he also collected ancient Italo-Greek vases (called "Etruscan"), apparently not for vanity, but for historical purposes. He also wrote poetry and wrote in Latin. He also taught experimental physics, law and sacred liturgy in the seminary of Molfetta.

In particular, Giovene could use, during the teachings of experimental physics, the many tools provided by his friend Giuseppe Saverio Poli. His students also held a demonstration in the large courtyard of the bishop's palace and seminary of Molfetta, during which experiments were conducted relating to electricity, air, gas, during which the use of pneumatic and electric tools aroused the curiosity of people of any kind. The experiments conducted by the students of Giovene were not even conducted by the local university at that time. This helped to increase the prestige of the seminary.

=== Last years ===
In 1820, he was also appointed member of the newly born constitutional parliament of the Kingdom of the Two Sicilies for a few months. Even in the last decade of his life he kept on being updated and reading books and newspapers. During this time, he became deaf, which made it difficult for him to communicate with others; moreover he began to suffer from paralysis to the bladder and the cataract came him to his left eye. For this reason he had to be helped to know the progress of the sciences and letters.

He also wrote a few books about religion and in addition, in the last part of his life, he was asked by the bishop of Molfetta Caracciolo to write a hagiography on Saint Conrad of Bavaria, protector of his hometown Molfetta. In order to write the book, he had to consult medieval sources and, in order to do so, he went to northern Italy and Germany. Pope Gregory XVI read his book and liked it, and thanks to this, Molfetta was granted the official recognition of the cult of Saint Conrad of Bavaria, which had already started in the XII century". His book on the saint also became famous in Germany.

He died in Molfetta on January 2, 1837. His last words were: "Leave me alone with my God." With a letter to his confessor and friend D. Paolo Rotondo, found after his death, forbade any funeral or funeral praises of any kind after his death, and he asked to be buried in Church of Saint Conrad of Bavaria. The funeral praise, however, was eventually read in the Church of Saint Conrad of Bavaria and it was printed in Naples by his grandnephew Luigi Marinelli Giovene (who also reprinted most of his works in a collection of several volumes entitled Raccolta di tutte le opere del cav. Giuseppe Maria Giovene 1839–1841). In addition, Giovene himself wrote the epigraph of his own tomb before his death.

== Scientific research ==
=== The "natural nitrary" of Pulo di Molfetta ===
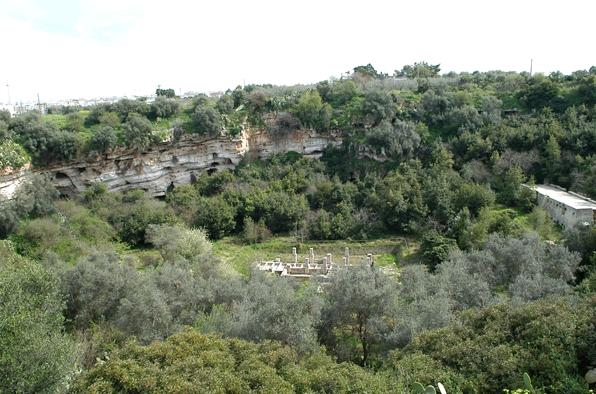
Pulo di Molfetta

The name of Giuseppe Maria Giovene is inextricably linked to the discovery of the so-called "natural nitrary" (Italian: nitriera naturale, which means a natural deposit of saltpetre) of Pulo di Molfetta.

In 1783, abbot Alberto Fortis visited Apulia in order to study the region, and Ciro Saverio Minervini appointed Giovene as Fortis' guide. On this occasion, Fortis and Giovene met, and Giovene later told Alberto Fortis about a doline of that region called Pulo di Molfetta, in which Giovene believed that there was saltpetre. After an inspection, Fortis noted that Giovene had been right and that there was saltpetre in that doline. According to other sources, however, Fortis and Giovene together discovered the "natural nitrary". According to Zimmermann, the discovery was made by Alberto Fortis, and Giovene just told Fortis about Pulo di Molfetta and accompanied him.

The discovery also generated issues; in particular, the discovery was initially challenged by some scholars. Subsequently, chemist Giuseppe Vairo and his assistant Antonio Pitaro confirmed the discovery. This undoubtedly damaged producers of artificial saltpetre, and some scholars, most likely supported by the producers, tried to dismiss the discovery. Following the discovery, a large number of naturalists sent by academies from all Europe came to visit Pulo di Molfetta, since the saltpeter was a fundamental ingredient in the production of gunpowder and that these deposits were of considerable strategic interest.

In particular, in a letter to Alberto Fortis dated 7 August 1784, Giovene refuted the idea of those who believed that the saltpetre of Pulo di Molfetta was due to some animals that once inhabited the doline. He also proved to be a talented chemist, and to be even more competent than the salt pans themselves, teaching them to correct the acidity of the ground (containing excessive amounts of "azotic acid") by adding plant ash.

During a trip with his brother over Apulia, Giovene noted that saltpetre was abundant in other areas of Apulia. The trip, together with Giovene's observations were reported in the aforementioned letter of 7 August 1784.

=== Agronomy and meteorology ===
In some of his writings, Giovene also studied a disease of olive trees caused by Pseudomonas savastanoi (in Italian, the disease is called rogna dell'ulivo). The disease can be recognized by the characteristic tumour. In particular, Giovene recognized that the disease was not caused by insects, although the insects formed. He also distinguished the tumours caused by frost from those generated by hail or blunt bodies. He also carried out some experiments where he boiled branches attacked by the disease, and he came to the conclusion that the tumours which weren't caused by frost were "germs of new twigs or branches suffocated in their birth". He came to this conclusion by cutting the tumours and observing the center. He also studied the worms and insects that "corrode and ravage the orchard."

During his life he also carried out research in meteorology. After the discovery of the "natural nitrary", scholars from many European academies came to Molfetta, and Giovene took the opportunity to meet and discuss with many of them. One of these was Giuseppe Toaldo, who made him interested in meteorology, as a science useful to regulate agriculture. During his life, Giovene collected atmospheric, rainfall and barometric data, and studied their development. From 1788 to 1797, he wrote, for every year and starting from his observations, a memory of rainfall and their consequences on agriculture. Giovene was also praised by the most illustrious Italian meteorologist of that period, Giuseppe Toaldo. In particular, if Giuseppe Toaldo can well be considered the founder of Italian meteorology, Giovene may well consider himself the founder of Italian rural meteorology, so much so that he managed to make some eminent scholars of that period more interested in meteorology, including Luca de Samuele Cagnazzi.

In his study Prospetto comparato della pioggia della Puglia (1805), Giovene asked his illustrious colleagues to obtain rainfall data for the nearby Apulian cities Altamura, Ariano, Teramo, in addition to data from Molfetta provided by Giovene himself. Luca de Samuele Cagnazzi provided data for his city Altamura, Giovanni Zerella provided data for Ariano, while Orazio Delfico provided data for Teramo. With his study, Giovene wanted to prove that the amount of rainfall which fell on Apulia wasn't that different from other European regions (such as some regions of France, which didn't have the same reputation of Apulia as a dry region). Although there are clear differences with other European regions more heavily watered by rain or with the South American city of Santo Domingo, the biggest difference, according to Giovene, is due to the irregularity of rainfall events.

One of the most innovative aspects of his meteorological studies is certainly that of comparing data that previously were not generally studied together, i.e. atmospheric electricity and atmospheric pressure. For these studies, culminating in his publication Osservazioni elettro-atmosferiche e barometriche insieme paragonate (1798), Carlo Amoretti stated that Giovene "had provided an invaluable service to meteorology and physics".

Moreover, in the Discorso meteorologico-campestre per l'anno 1797 (1798), Giovene had the brilliant and innovative idea that the exceptional event that occurred in 1797, i.e. drought continuing beyond the first days of August (in contrast with the observations of the previous years), could be caused by the decrease in sunspots, which was observed by astronomers.

=== Electricity ===
Giovene also contributed to what was then called elettricismo; in particular, he studied atmospheric electricity. He studied the electricity and pressure variation of the atmosphere and he wrote Osservazione elettro-atmosferiche e barometriche insieme paragonate (1798). Moreover, after reading Jan Hendrik van Swinden's work Dissertation on the Irregular Motions of the Magnetic Needle, he also wrote an annex to the above essay, in which he explained how his observations confirmed Van Swinden's conclusions on the correlation between atmospheric pressure, atmospheric electricity, Aurora and oscillations of the Earth's magnetic field.

=== Rain dust ===
Giuseppe Maria Giovene also correctly explained the phenomenon of the so-called red rain dust (Italian: pioggia rossa), fallen on Apulia on 7 March 1803. It was believed at that time that the rain was caused by the explosion of Italy's volcanoes Mount Vesuvius or Etna, or that it was due to the transport of matter coming from the sea floor and raised by vapor. Giuseppe Maria Giovene brilliantly related the phenomenon to the wind occurred prior to the rain event, and he came to the conclusion that the sand came from Africa and that it had been pushed by the wind coming from south-east.

=== Entomology ===
In a paper entitled Descrizione e storia della cocciniglia dell'ulivo (1807), Giovene also dealt with the insect "Coccus oleae" (also "Saissetia oleae"), answering Giovanni Presta, who denied the existence of the insect in the provinces of Bari and Otranto. Giovene showed that the insect was widespread in those regions, albeit rarer. Moreover, Giovene also discovered the male of the cochineal, which wasn't known in much of Europe. In the "Dictionary of natural history" of Paris (1816) (French: Nouveau dictionnaire d'histoire naturelle, appliquée aux arts, à l'agriculture, à l'économie rurale et domestique, à la médecine, etc.) it was written: "the male is not known" (French: Le mâle n' est pas connu).

He also wrote the work Avviso per la distruzione dei vermi che attaccano la polpa delle olive (1792), in which he provided some suggestions for the peasants in order to effectively destroy the worms musca oleae, which infested the pulp of the olive trees.

Giovene intended to collect his writings Sulla rogna degli ulivi (1789), Avviso per la distruzione dei vermi che attaccano la polpa delle olive (1792), Descrizione e storia della cocciniglia dell'ulivo (1807) into a single treaty on the diseases of olive trees, but he didn't accomplish his initial commitment. In 1813, he also wrote the work Delle cavallette pugliesi ("On Apulian grasshoppers").

=== Ichthyology ===
Giovene also carried out some research on ichthyology by studying marine life. He used to ask fishermen to bring him the most uncommon marine species they could find, and he paid for them. He also wrote the works Notizie sull'Argonauta Argo del Linneo and Di alcuni pesci del mare di Puglia (1827). In this last work, he showed that some marine species that were considered rare and exotic in reality populated the Mediterranean Sea.

=== Dating the Earth ===
Giuseppe Maria Giovene never hid his profound religiousness, as well as the contempt for atheism, which he considered to be true "dementia." He also based his assumptions on what was written in the Bible. In this regard, he criticized the new scientific theories according to which the Earth was actually much older than what was written in the Bible. In some unpublished speeches held at the Academy of Catholic Religion in Rome (Accademia di Religione Cattolica in Roma) – Della pretesa antichità del tempo and Delle lave dell'Etna e degli argomenti che si pretende tirare per la molta antichità della Terra – he tried to refute those that Giovene considered distorted interpretations of natural history.

His work Di alcuni pesci del mare di Puglia (1827) also contains explicit references to what he considered unnatural interpretations which, through the analysis of the fossils, dated the Earth too far back ("to imagine centuries without number").

== Theology ==
In his life, Giovene also wrote a few works on theology, including a hagiography in Latin entitled Vita Beati Corradi Bavari (1836), about the life of Saint Conrad of Bavaria, and for this purpose he had to travel to North Italy and Germany in order to consult medieval sources about the saint. His work was appreciated by Pope Gregory XVI, and it granted the city of Molfetta the official recognition of the cult of Saint Conrad of Bavaria, which had started in Molfetta as early as the XII century.

He also wrote a letter to Saverio Mattei, in which he answered the question Mattei had asked Giuseppe Vairo on the type of matter Jesus Christ referred to in the passage from the gospel where he said to the apostles vos estis sal terrae (which means "you are the salt of the earth") Giovene, with reasoning in which he showed his erudition and his knowledge of physics and chemistry, came to the conclusion that Jesus Christ referred to saltpetre (potassium nitrate).

== Charity ==
Giuseppe Maria Giovene was also known for his altruism, especially towards the poor, orphans, widows and the oppressed. Even though he was busy in his numerous commitments and ecclesiastical assignments as well as in his studies, he managed to find time to offer legal counsel to the poor, especially to those who were oppressed and persecuted by the powerful. Moreover, he often provided them with financial aid. In particular, after the death of his brother, baron Graziano Giovene, he had become rich, and he decided to share it with the poor.

== The Società italiana delle scienze di Verona ==
Due to the death of Lazzaro Spallanzani (1799), he was appointed as his successor in the Società italiana delle scienze di Verona, thus becoming one of its 40 members and publishing articles in almost every volume of the learned society's proceedings.

== Works and scientific publications ==
- Giuseppe Maria Giovene (1775). Orazione pei solenni funerali di D. Celestino Orlandi.
- Giuseppe Maria Giovene (7 August 1784). Lettera del Sig. canonico D. Giuseppe Maria Giovene, Vicario generale di Molfetta, al Sig. Abate Alberto Fortis, contenente varie osservazioni sulla nitrosità naturale della Puglia. Molfetta.
- Giuseppe Maria Giovene (1788). Lettera del signor canonico Giovene al signor D. Saverio Mattei. Napoli: Tip. f.lli Cannone. p. 26.
- Giuseppe Maria Giovene (1789). Sulla rogna degli ulivi. Napoli: Vincenzo Flauto. p. 1.
- Giuseppe Maria Giovene (1839). Sulla coltura degli ulivi e del modo di preparare il frutto per farne uso sulle mense, e di estrarne l'olio, con una ricetta per la conservazione delle ulive del canonico D. Giuseppe Maria Giovene. Cannone.
- Giuseppe Maria Giovene (1790). Lettera al Ch. Sig. Consigliere Mattei diretta a provare che Cristo N.S. allorquando disse agli Apostoli "Vos estis sal terrae" intese di paragonarli al Salnitro.
- Giuseppe Maria Giovene (1792). Avviso per la distruzione dei vermi che attaccano la polpa delle olive. Cannone.
- Giuseppe Maria Giovene (1798). "Osservazioni elettro-atmosferiche e barometriche insieme paragonate". Memorie della Società Italiania delle Scienze. 8.
- Giuseppe Maria Giovene (1802). "Appendice alle Osservazioni elettro-atmosferiche e barometriche insieme paragonate". Memorie di Matematica e Fisica della Società Italiana delle Scienze. IX. Modena: Società Tipografica.
- Giuseppe Maria Giovene (1839). "Istruzione su la coltura del cotone a color di camoscio mandata alla Società patriotica di Milano". Atti della Società Patriotica di Milano.
- Giuseppe Maria Giovene (1839). "Sopra la caduta delle foglie degli alberi in autunno". Atti della Società Italiana delle Scienze di Modena. 13.
- Giuseppe Maria Giovene (1839). Sonno delle piante. Cannone.
- Giuseppe Maria Giovene. Discorsi meteorologico-campestri per gli anni 1788–1796 (nine publications).
- Giuseppe Maria Giovene (1798). "Discorso meteorologico-campestre per l'anno 1797". Giornale Letterario di Napoli. 46. Napoli: Vincenzo Manfredi.
- Giuseppe Maria Giovene. "Notizie sull'Argonauta Argo del Linneo". Memorie della Società Italiana delle Scienze. 14.
- Giuseppe Maria Giovene (1803). Lettera su di una pioggia rossa.
- Giuseppe Maria Giovene (1806). "Lettera al celebre sig. Thouvenel su alcuni fenomeni fisici della Puglia (o Lettera sulla malaria, datata 6 ottobre 1804)". Mémoires sur l'aérologie et l'élctrologie. I. Parigi: Imprimerie de Valade.
- Giuseppe Maria Giovene (1804). La mia villeggiatura. Parma: Stamperia Carmignani. p. 52.
- Giuseppe Maria Giovene (1805). "Prospetto comparato della pioggia della Puglia". Memorie di Matematica e Fisica della Società Italiana delle Scienze. 12, parte 2. Modena: Società Tipografica.
- Giuseppe Maria Giovene (1807). "Descrizione e storia della cocciniglia dell'ulivo". Atti della Società Italiana delle Scienze. 14 (parte seconda).
- Giuseppe Maria Giovene (1808). "Notizie di un banco di tufo lacustre in riva del mare presso Trani". Atti della Società Italiana delle Scienze. Verona.
- Giuseppe Maria Giovene (1810). "Notize geologiche e meteorologiche della Japigia". Società Italiana delle Scienze. XV. Verona: Tipografia di Luigi Mainardi.
- Giuseppe Maria Giovene (1810). "Discorso pronunziato in occasione dell'installazione della Società agraria in Lecce". Atti delle Installazioni delle Società d'Agricoltura del Regno di Napoli.
- Giuseppe Maria Giovene. Notize geologiche su le due Puglie, Peucezia e Daunia e della Provincia di Principato Citra nel Regno di Napoli. (continuazione delle precedenti Notizie geologiche)
- Giuseppe Maria Giovene (1813). "Delle cavallette pugliesi". Memorie di Matematica e di Fisica della Società Italiana delle Scienze. XVI, parte II. Verona: Tipografia di Luigi Mainardi.
- Giuseppe Maria Giovene (1827). "Dissertazione sul sacramento della penitenza". Biblioteca Cattolica. 8. Napoli: 291.
- Giuseppe Maria Giovene (1829). "Di alcuni pesci del mare di Puglia, ricevuta adì 28 giugno 1827". Memorie di Matematica e di Fisica della Società Italiana delle Scienze Residente in Modena. XX, parte delle Memorie di fisica. Modena: Tipografia Camerale.
- Giuseppe Maria Giovene (1839). "Sopra alcune rose prolifere". Atti della Società Italiana delle Scienze. 11.
- Giuseppe Maria Giovene (1839). Lettera ad un amico in Provincia di Lecce su la piantagione della vigna. Cannone. (after 1807)
- Giuseppe Maria Giovene (1839). Lettera al dottor Cosimo Moschettini su la ruggine [malattia del grano]. Cannone.
- Giuseppe Maria Giovene (1839). Orobanche. Cannone.
- Giuseppe Maria Giovene (1828). Kalendaria Vetera Manuscripta Aliaque Monumenta Ecclesiarum Apuliae et Japigiae – Pars I (in Latin). Napoli: Typographia Vid. Realis et Filior.
- Giuseppe Maria Giovene. Esame dell'opera di Mastrofini sopra l'usura.
- Giuseppe Maria Giovene (1836). Vita Beati Conradi Bavari (in Latin). Napoli: Tipografia Garrucci., dopo la morte di Giovene è stato anche tradotto in italiano: Giuseppe Maria Giovene (1839). Vita del Beato Corrado Bavaro. Translated by Vito Fornari. Napoli: Tipografia sita Carrozzieri a Montoliveto n. 13.
- Giuseppe Maria Giovene (1839–1841). "Della nitriera naturale di Molfetta, detta Pulo". Opere. 2. (pubblicata dopo la morte)

=== Other works (some of which unpublished, unfinished or never written) ===
- Kalendaria Vetera Manuscripta Aliaque Monumenta Ecclesiarum Apuliae et Japigiae – Pars II (in Latin).
- Topographia locorum aliquot Japigiae ementata (in Latin).
- Delle chiese suburbane e numero dei vescovi di esse.
- Del digiuno e dell'astinenza ecclesiastica.
- Che bastano i soli salmi per provare una divina rivelazione.
- Conformità dell'agricoltura con lo spirito del Cristianesimo.
- Catalogo ragionato dei grilli di Puglia.
- La mia villeggiatura – Parte seconda.
- Conformità dell'agricoltura con lo spirito del Cristianesimo.
- Discorsi tenuti nell'Accademia di Religione Cattolica in Roma – I – Della celebrità di N.S. Gesù Cristo.
- Discorsi tenuti nell'Accademia di Religione Cattolica in Roma – II – Della pretesa antichità del tempo.
- Discorsi tenuti nell'Accademia di Religione Cattolica in Roma – III – Delle lave dell'Etna e degli argomenti che si pretende tirare per la molta antichità della Terra.

== Bibliography ==
- AA.VV. (1841). Biografia universale antica e moderna. Vol. 9. Venezia: Tipografia di Alvisopoli. p. 150.
- AA.VV. (1838). Emilio De Tipaldo (ed.). Biografia degli italiani illustri nelle scienze, lettere ed arti del XVII e de' contemporanei compilata da letterati italiani di ogni provincia. Vol. 6. Venezia: Tipografia di Alvisopoli. p. 150.
- Pietro Filioli (1837). "Necrologia – Giuseppe Maria Giovene – Arciprete della Cattedrale Chiesa di Molfetta". Annali Civili del Regno delle Due Sicilie. 25, gennaio e febbraio. Tipografia del Real Ministero degli Affari Interni nel Reale Albergo de' Poveri.
- Carlo Tortora Brayda (1837). "Necrologia – Giuseppe Maria Giovene". Il Progresso delle Scienze, delle Lettere e delle Arti. 16, anno 6. Napoli: Tipografia Flautina.
- Giovanni Gioia (1837). Elogio funebre dell'illustre arciprete d. Giuseppe Maria Giovene ... pronunciata nei solenni funerali celebrati nella chiesa cattedrale dal venerabile seminario di Molfetta dal canonico D. Giovanni Gioja.
- Andrea Tripaldi (1841). "Elogio storico del canonico arciprete Giuseppe Maria Giovene". Memorie di Matematica e di Fisica della Società Italiana delle Scienze Residente in Modena. 22. Modena: Tipi della R. D. Camera.
- Luigi Marinelli Giovene, ed. (1839). Raccolta di tutte le opere del cav. Giuseppe Maria Giovene – Parte prima – Memorie fisico agrarie. Vol. 1. Bari: Tipografia Fratelli Cannone.
- Luigi Marinelli Giovene, ed. (1841). Raccolta di tutte le opere del cav. Giuseppe Maria Giovene – Parte terza – Memorie diverse. Vol. 3. Bari: Tipografia Fratelli Cannone.
- Camillo Minieri Riccio (1844). Memorie storiche degli scrittori nati nel Regno di Napoli. Napoli: Tipografia Dell'Aquila di V. Puzziello nel chiostro San Tommaso d'Acquino. p. 151.
- Eberhard August Wilhelm von Zimmermann (1790). Voyage a la nitrière naturelle qui se trouve à Molfetta dans la terre de Bari en Pouille. Venezia: Jacque Storti. p. 1.
- Carmelo Colamonico (1917). "Il pulo di Altamura". Mondo Sotterraneo. Udine: Tipografia Domenico Del Bianco.
