= Alta Murgia National Park =

National park in Apulia, southern Italy

Parco Nazionale dell'Alta Murgia
- IUCN category II (national park)
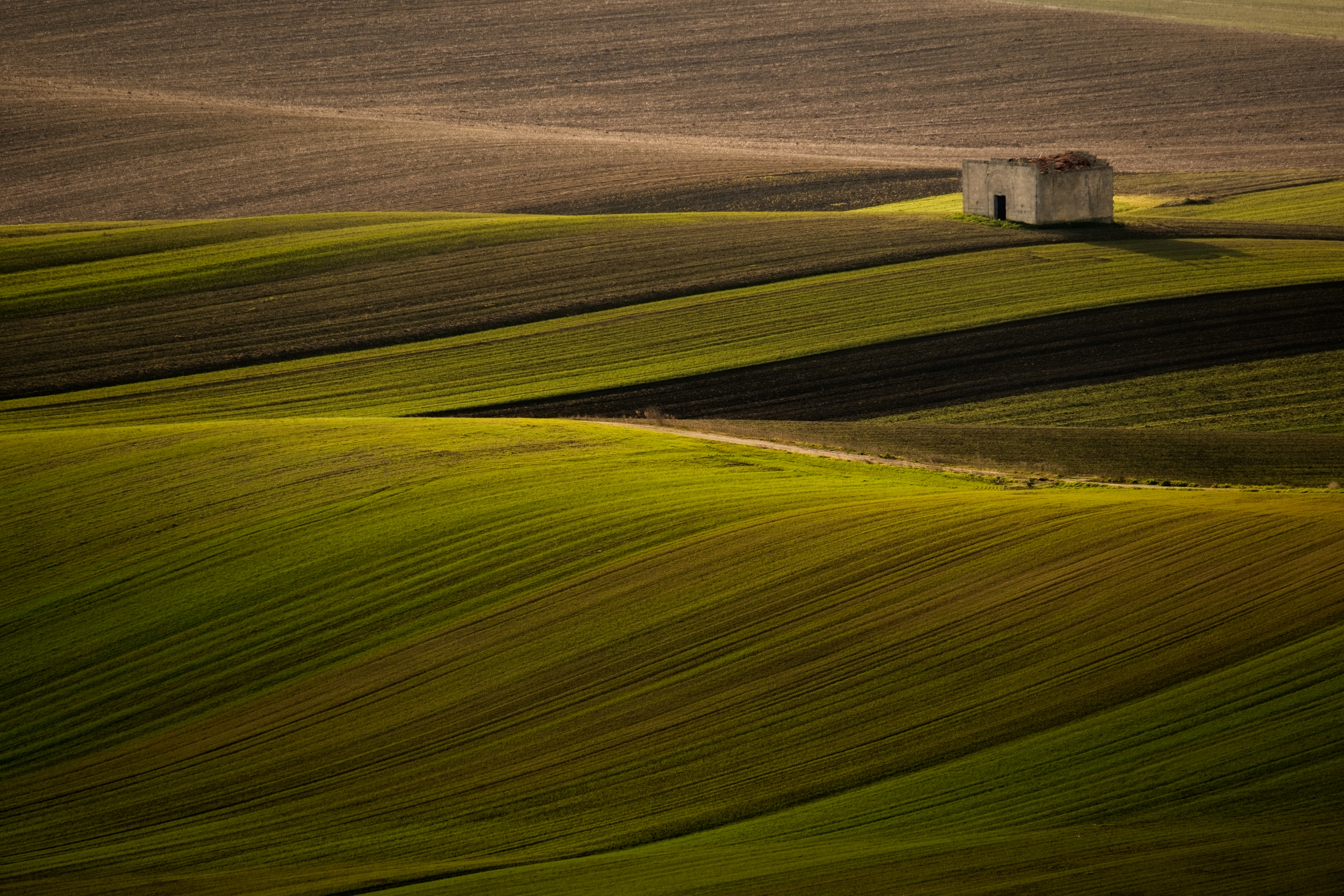
- Poggiorsini dale in Alta Murgia National Park

- Location within Italy
- Location: Apulia
- Nearest city: Bari
- Coordinates: 40°59′24″N 16°22′12″E
- Area: 677.39 km^{2} (261.54 sq mi)
- Established: 2004
- Governing body: Ministero dell'Ambiente
- Website: www.parks.it/parco.nazionale.alta.murgia/Eindex.html

The Parco Nazionale dell'Alta Murgia is a national park in Apulia, southern Italy, established in 2004. It lies in the Murgia geographical area, with its headquarters in the town of Gravina in Puglia, and has an area of 677.39 square kilometres. It is part of a larger Special Protection Area established to protect the grass steppe, lesser kestrel's habitat (Site of Community Importance).

== Sites of interest ==
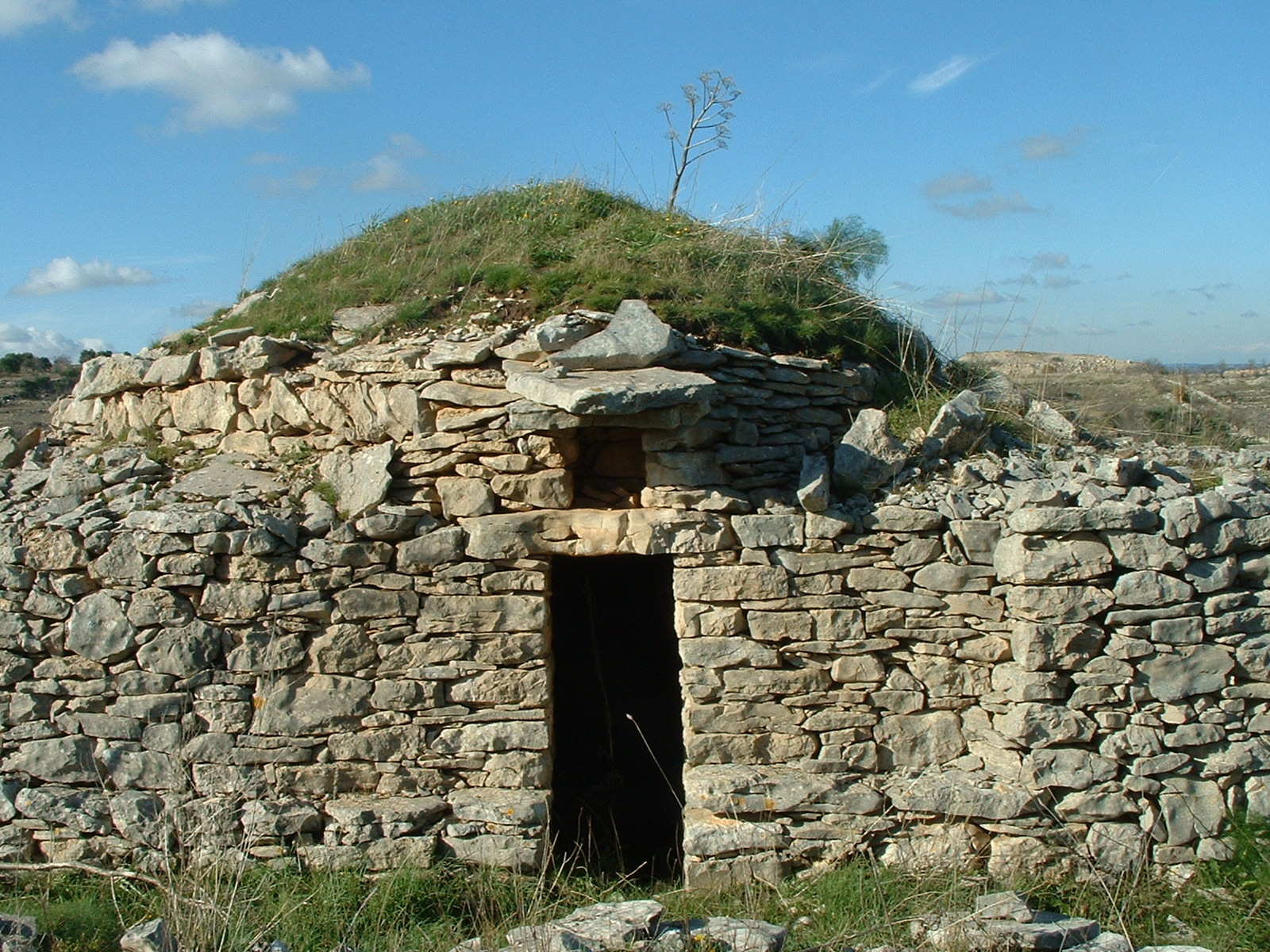
A trullo in the National Park

Castel del Monte, one of the most famous castles in southern Italy and a World Heritage Site, is one of the most important sites located inside the park. Other sites or structures of interest include:

- the bauxite mines of Murgetta in the Spinazzola area;
- the Swabian castle of Gravina in Puglia;
- the herbarium museum of Ruvo di Puglia;
- Robinson's municipal park and the pine forest of Gravina in Puglia;
- Galietti's pine forest of Santeramo in Colle;
- Mesola's forest of Cassano delle Murge;
- Lagopetto's municipal pine forest of Grumo Appula;
- Mercadante's forest in the territory of Cassano delle Murge and Altamura;
- the archaeological park of Botromagno and Padre Eterno of Gravina in Puglia;
- Pulo di Altamura, representing the largest karst sinkhole in the area (about 6 km north of Altamura);
- Pulicchio di Gravina, the second largest karst sinkhole of the area, 10 km from the town of Gravina in Puglia;
- Faraualla's grave, another deep karst sinkhole in the territory of Gravina in Puglia;
- Lamalunga cave, which housed Altamura Man;
- the cave of Santa Maria degli Angeli in Cassano delle Murge;
- San Magno's necropolis in Corato;
- the valley of the dinosaurs in Altamura, where dinosaur footprints were found in 1999;
- jazzi, rock constructions used during periods of transhumance, more frequently found in the territories of Andria, Gravina, Ruvo, Minervino and Spinazzola.
