= Gurio Lamanna =

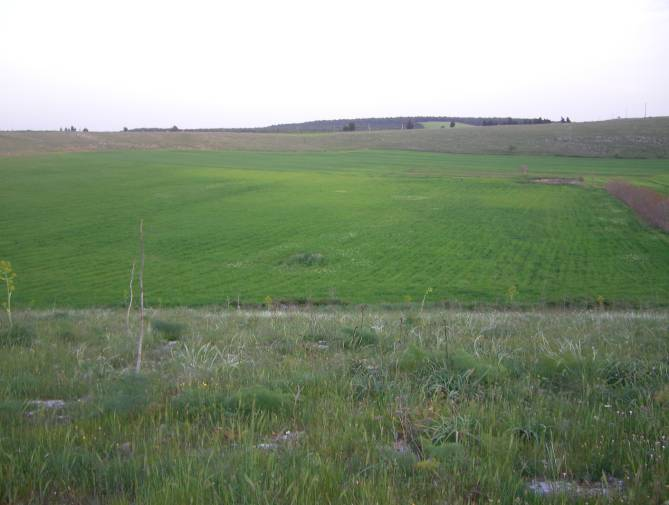
- Gurio Lamanna

- Location within Italy
- Location: Gravina in Puglia, Apulia, Italy
- Coordinates: 40°54′32″N 16°25′33″E
- Depth: 38 meters (125 ft)
- Length: 900 meters (3,000 ft)
- Geology: Karst

Gurio Lamanna (also incorrectly called Gurlamanna) is a doline shaped like a coat of arms located in the Murge plateau and falling into Gravina in Puglia's territory, on the border with Altamura, Apulia, southern Italy. It is "one of the largest karst landforms of the Murge plateau" and it is located very close to other two dolines, namely Pulicchio di Gravina and Tre Paduli. Depending on the type of geomorphologic classification employed and the author who suggested it, the karst landform can be defined either a doline or a "karst basin" (Italian: bacino carsico). It is traditionally called "karst basin", following the suggestion of Carmelo Colamonico, who first studied the doline and saw in its large size and shallow depth a good reason to distinguish it from a normal doline. The definition of "karst basin", used by Carmelo Colamonico, has been introduced by Renato Biasutti. Carmelo Colamonico stated that Gurio Lamanna is "one of the best examples of karst basin in the Murge plateau".

== Characteristics and dimensions ==
The doline has an external perimeter of over 3 kilometers (1.9 mi), an average length of 900 meters (3,000 ft) ca. and a maximum depth of 38 meters (125 ft). It covers an area of 68,000 square meters (730,000 sq ft). Its walls have a low steepness compared to the nearby doline Pulicchio di Gravina. The bottom of the doline is flat "like a table"; such a flat expanse of land is very uncommon in the barren and hilly landscape of the Murge region. From this point of view, it may be likened to another large "karst basin", that is the expanse of Pescariello (Altamura), far wider and similarly karst.

The doline includes a sinkhole, into which part of the rainwater collected in its drainage basin flows out.

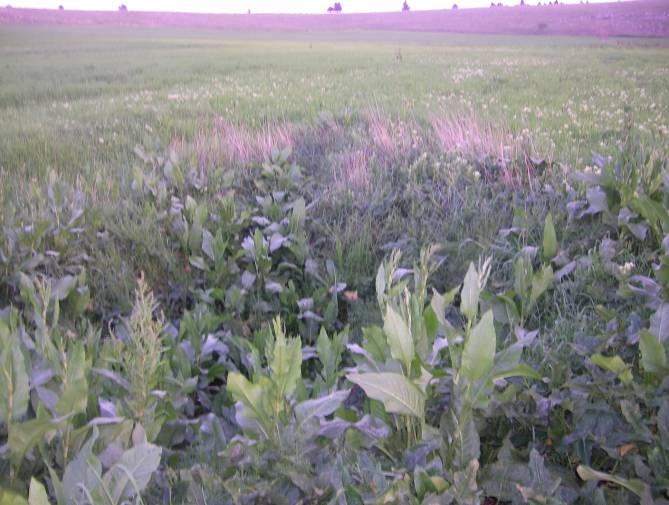
Gurio Lamanna's sinkhole.

The whole flat area contains a deep layer of fertile soil, L'intera area piatta contiene un notevole strato di terreno fertile, consequence of the millenary erosion and which is successfully cultivated together with the nearby doline Tre Paduli. Also because of this, the area is different from the stony, arid and difficult to grow Murge region.

During the storms, the water in the doline reaches a relatively high level. This water flows out partly via the sinkhole partly via the porous limestone external walls. The water is absorbed in a very short time, usually a few hours. Water stagnates longer in the central area, which is also the lowest. In this central area, at the time of Carmelo Colamonico (1917), there was a tree and a pit for rainwater, while today there is an open tank used for rainwater.

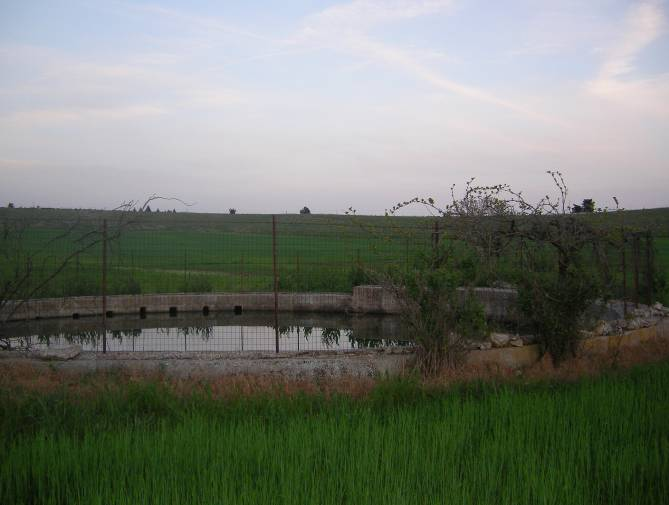
The open water tank collecting rainwater in the middle of the doline

Close to the doline are the ruins of a small XX century primary school both for children and adults.

== History ==
The doline (or "karst basin") was practically unknown among scientists and scholars until the first study published by Carmelo Colamonico in 1917. Previously it had been cited only by F. Virgilio (1900), who called it just "Gurio".

== Etymology ==
Carmelo Colamonico was the first person who called it with its name. He noticed that on the maps of the Italian geographic institute Istituto Geografico Militare of that time the area, comprising a cluster of buildings nearby, was just named Masseria Crocetta, but its real name instead was Masseria Gurio Lamanna. Carmelo Colamonico identified the real nome of the area (Masseria Gurio Lamanna) and first used the term "Gurio Lamanna" to refer to the doline. As a proof of the correctness of Carmelo Colamonico's intuition, the word gurio is used in the Murge region to denote a large and flat sinkhole collecting a large amount of rainwater.

== Origin and evolution ==
The origin of the karst basin Gurio Lamanna can be explained with karst processes. The water coming from the relative drainage basin has slowly but constantly eroded (according to the usual double action - chemical and mechanical - of rainwater, typical of karst phenomena) the area, leading to the formation of the wide flat area full of fertile soil that is visible today.

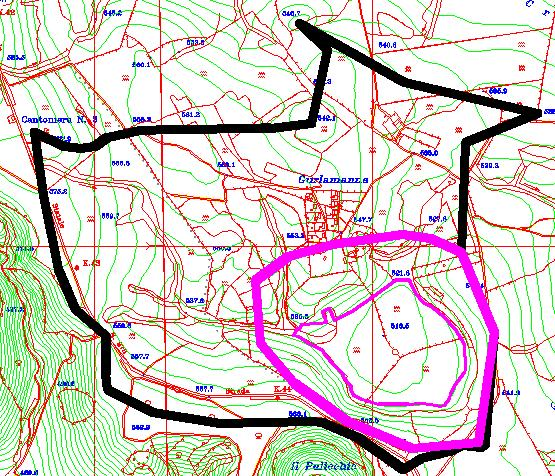
Sketch of the drainage basin, whose endpoint (lowest point) is Gurio Lamanna

Carmelo Colamonico hypothesized that, initially, there may have been a ditch in direction NW-SE caused by tectonic phenomena. Nevertheless, he noticed that today's dimensions would have never been reached if there had not been the double action of rainwater coming from such a large drainage basin (karst).

Rainwater mainly comes from two lamas, one located NW and the other NE. Both of them contribute to the erosion phenomenon, although the NW lama probably contributed (and still contributes) more than the NE lama. The erosion occurred (and still occurs) mainly in the northern direction in the region between the two lamas.

== See also ==
- Altamura
- Gravina in Puglia
- Lama (geology)
- Pulicchio di Gravina
- Pulo di Altamura

== Sources ==
- Colamonico, Carmelo (1917). "Il bacino carsico di Gurio Lamanna nelle Murge alte". Mondo Sotterraneo (in Italian). XIII. Udine: Tipografia Domenico Del Bianco.
- Virgilio, F. (1900). "Geomorfogenia della provincia di Bari". Terra di Bari (in Italian). 3. Trani: Vecchi.
- Biasutti, Renato (1916). "Sulla nomenclatura relativa ai fenomeni carsici". Rivista Geografica Italiana (in Italian). 3 (f. 1). Florence.
