= Aphronitre =

Ancient form of nitre

Aphronitre, or aphronitrum, is a kind of nitre, mentioned in ancient texts. It was supposed to be the foam or froth of a liquid, emerging to the top. Naturalists have taken the ancient aphronitre to have been a native saltpetre.

== See also ==
- Potassium nitrate
