= Renato Biasutti =

Italian anthropologist and geographer (1878–1965)

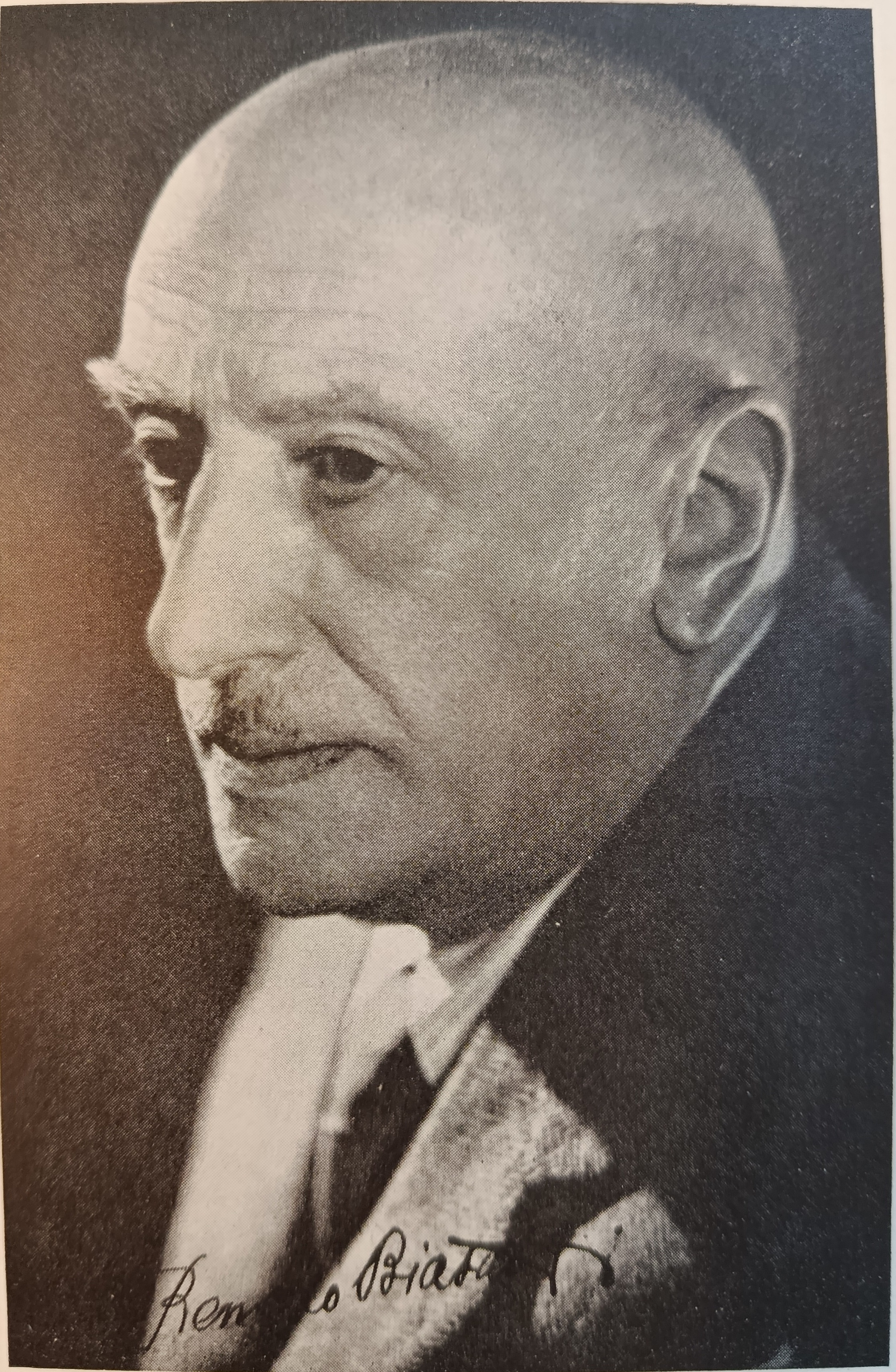
Renato Biasutti

Renato Biasutti (San Daniele del Friuli, 22 March 1878 – Florence, 3 March 1965) was a notable Italian geographer, who published many works on physical anthropology.

== Life ==
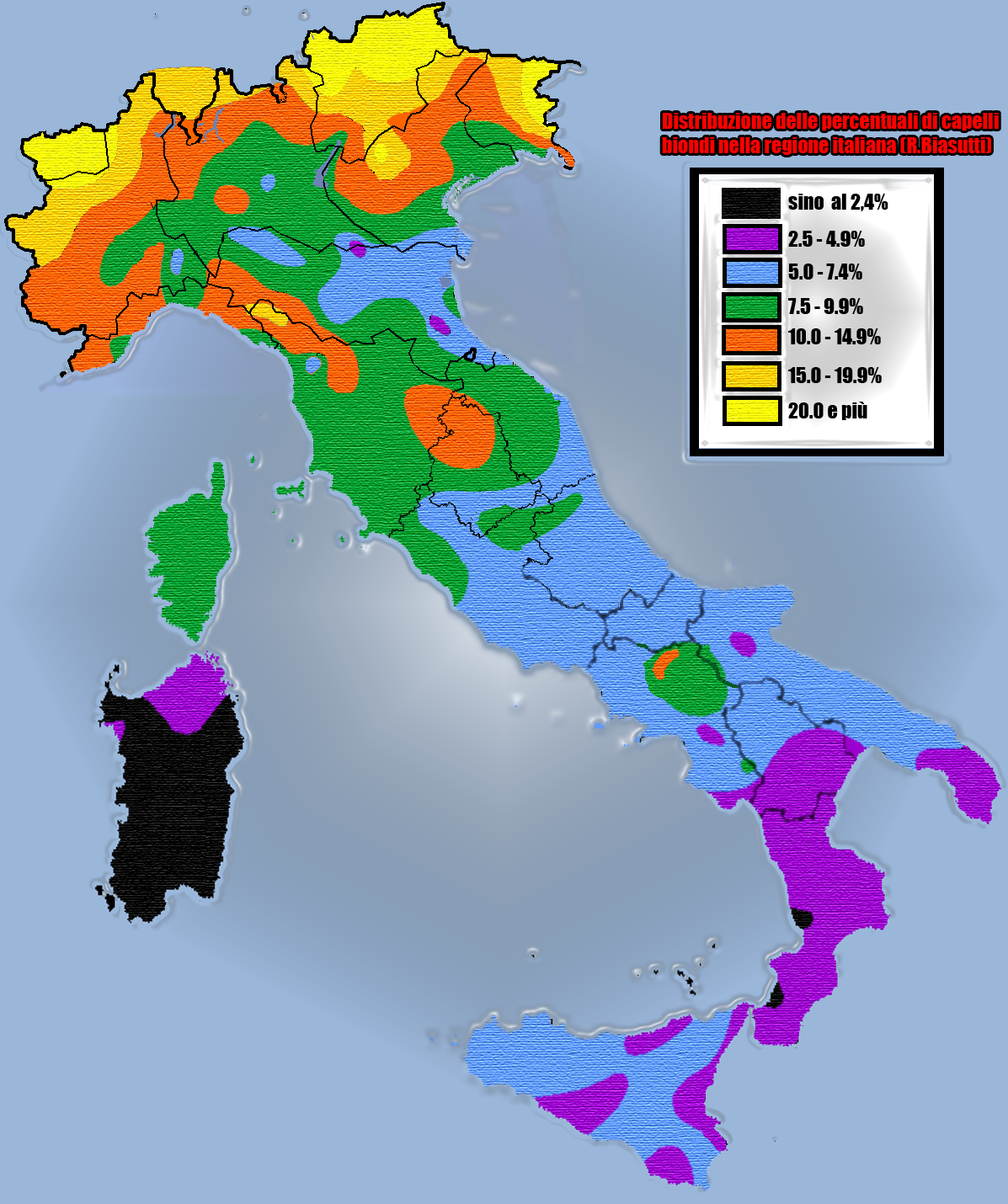
Percentage of blond hairs in the Italian regions and Corsica (France), from the studies of Renato Biasutti done in 1941

He studied in the University of Florence under the guidance of Giovanni Marinelli and later taught at the Universities of Naples and Florence.

During the 1926 census, he traveled from town to town to conduct research on the life in the rural homes of Italy. Its first volume, which came to light in 1938, was titled La casa rurale in Toscana (The Farm-house in Tuscany). In this research on the Tuscan farmhouses, Biasutti contributed to the methods of anthropological research by first giving a thorough description of the geographic reality in which the object to be studied is contained.

In 1905, Biasutti explored Eritrea, and in 1914 visited Tibet, as well as Cyrenaica and Rhodes. He also explored the United States of America in 1912 and Egypt in 1925.

His main work is the Le razze e i popoli della terra, published for the first edition in 1941. The fourth and last edition was published in 1967, after his death. He was awarded by the Italian Accademia dei Lincei because of this book in 1951.

From 1933 until 1957 he directed the Rivista geografica italiana and in those decades he was also President of the Società di studi geografici di Firenze. From 1947 until 1953, Biasutti was Manager of "Ethnological Geography" of the Italian Consiglio nazionale delle ricerche (CNR).

Biasutti was a member of the "Accademia dei Lincei", when he died in 1965, and he was also known for his contributions in the field of geology about the classification of the dolines, used to classify dolines like Gurio Lamanna.

== Partial bibliography ==
- Biasutti, Renato (1916). "Sulla nomenclatura relativa ai fenomeni carsici". Rivista Geografica Italiana (in Italian). 3 (f. 1). Florence.
- Le Razze e i Popoli della Terra, v. 1-4., Renato Biasutti et al., Unione Tipografico-Editrice, Turin, ed. 3, 1959. pp. 2914, ill. 37,000 reviewed by Carleton S. Coon in Science 1 July 1960: Vol. 132 no. 3418 p. 29
- La casa rurale nella Lunigiana. La casa rurale della Toscana. Fondi, Mario e Biasutti, Renato. Casa Editrice Leo S. Olschki, Firenze, 1952. ISBN 8822229487

== See also ==
- Geography
