= Carolyn L. White =

American archaeologist

- Born: September 15, 1969 (age 57)
- Known for: Material culture studies; Contemporary archaeology

Academic background
- Education: Oberlin College; Boston University

Carolyn L. White (born September 15, 1969) is an American archaeologist whose work has included material culture studies, historic preservation, and the examination of contemporary sites. She is a professor at Boston University and directs the university’s Preservation Studies Program. Before this, she taught at the University of Nevada, Reno, where she held the Mamie Kleberg Endowed Chair in Historic Preservation from 2011 to 2024.

== Career ==
White completed her undergraduate degree at Oberlin College and later a Ph.D. in archaeology from Boston University.

== Burning Man research ==
White is the author of The Archaeology of Burning Man: The Rise and Fall of Black Rock City (2020), a study of the temporary settlement created for the Burning Man event in Nevada. The book has been discussed in several academic journals, including Buildings & Landscapes, Post-Medieval Archaeology, Norwegian Archaeological Review, and Ethnoarchaeology.

== Work with Steven Seidenberg ==
White has contributed to several articles with photographer and artist Steven Seidenberg. Their joint projects have appeared in Places Journal and focus on marginal built environments, both contemporary and historical.

== Selected publications ==
=== Books ===
- American Artifacts of Personal Adornment, 1680–1820 (2005)
- The Materiality of Individuality (editor, 2009)
- Trade and Exchange (co-editor, 2009)
- Chinese Export Porcelains (2009, with Andrew D. Madsen)
- The Archaeology of Burning Man (2020)

== Media ==
White’s work has been noted in KNPR’s State of Nevada, Discover Magazine, and Boston University publications.
