= Altamura Man =

Hominin fossil

Coordinates: 40.8170°N 16.5500°E

- Altamura Man, surrounded by limestone deposits
- Common name: Altamura Man
- Species: Neanderthal
- Age: 157,500 years (aged c. 35)
- Place discovered: Altamura, Apulia, Italy
- Date discovered: October 1993

Map

The Altamura Man is a fossil of the genus Homo discovered in 1993 in a karst sinkhole in the Lamalunga Cave near the city of Altamura, Italy. Remarkably well preserved but covered in a thick layer of calcite, taking the shape of cave popcorn, the find was left in situ in order to avoid damage. Research during the following twenty years was based mainly on the documented on-site observations. Consequently, experts remained reluctant to agree on a conclusive age nor was there consensus on the species it belonged to.

Only after a fragment of the right scapula (shoulder blade) was retrieved was it possible to produce an accurate dating of the individual, an analysis and diagnostic of its morphological features, and a preliminary paleogenetic characterization. In a 2015 paper published in the Journal of Human Evolution, it was announced that the fossil was a Neanderthal, and dating of the calcite has revealed that the bones are between 128,000 and 187,000 years old.

Altamura Man is one of the most complete Paleolithic skeletons ever to be discovered in Europe as "even the bones inside the nose are still there"; as of 2016, it represents the oldest sample of Neanderthal DNA to have been sequenced successfully.

== Discovery ==
Hominin timeline
← / Earlier apes; ← / Gorilla split; ← / Chimpanzee split; ← / Earliest bipedal; ← / Earliest sign of Ardipithecus; ← / Earliest sign of Australopithecus; ← / Earliest stone tools; ← / Earliest sign of Homo; ← / Dispersal beyond Africa; ← / Earliest fire / cooking; ← / Earliest rock art; ← / Earliest clothes; ← / Modern humans
(million years ago)

The skull was discovered in October 1993 by speleologists of CARS (Centro Altamurano Ricerche Speleologiche) in the cave of Lamalunga in Altamura, Italy. While exploring the cave, the researchers stumbled upon a 10 m (33 ft) deep karst sinkhole, formed by the action of running water on limestone. The sinkhole merges into a tunnel about 60 m (200 ft) long in which they found the Altamura Man incorporated into the calcium carbonate concretions that had formed by water dribbling down the cave walls. The finding was reported to researchers at the University of Bari.

== Fossil morphology and left in place ==
The fossilized skull of an adult male displays the anthropological features of the hypodigm of Homo neanderthalensis who lived during the Middle-Upper Pleistocene between 170,000 and 130,000 BP. Yet a number of phenetic peculiarities exist, such as the shape of the brow ridges, the relative dimension of the mastoids and the general architecture of the cranial vault, which according to the research team of the Sapienza University of Rome support accepted speciation chronology. "It shows archaic traits, making the Altamura Man a sort of morphological bridge between the previous human species such as Homo heidelbergensis and the Neanderthals".

Chronological studies on twenty faunal remains retrieved from the Cave of Lamalunga based on Uranium-thorium dating by Maria Elisabetta Branca and Mario Voltaggio of IGAG (Institute of Environmental Geology and Geoengineering) and CNR (Italian National Research Council) in Rome and published in 2010 show a deposition age varying between 45,000 and 17,000 BP, with the majority of remains varying between 45,000 and 30,000 years ago. Accumulation of cave deposits were found to begin around 170,000 years ago and ended 17,000 years ago.

=== Research into the remains ===
Researchers associated with the University of Bari have carried out laser scans of the find, obtaining numerical maps, models and three-dimensional videos of the fossil. Results of a study of the DNA sample taken from the scapula determined that it belongs to the genetic variability of the "Neanderthal of Southern Europe".

Between 1998 and 2000, the "Sarastro" project was carried out by Digamma Research Consortium, using integrated tele-operated systems that allowed remote access and observation of the site.

More recent research analysis that began in 2009 and based on uranium-thorium dating revealed that the calcite was formed 172,000 to 130,000 years ago during the penultimate quaternary glaciation period.

=== Remains left in place ===
The Altamura man remains embedded in a matrix of limestone to this day. As such, a running challenge exists among experts to devise a way to remove the fossil intact. The remaining skeleton is in an excellent state of preservation and is unaffected by weather and disarticulation (dispersion of skeletal structure by scavengers); the calcite preserved the bones, but it also covered them to a great extent. It was thought that excavating the remains would cause irreparable damage and thus the bones have remained in situ for decades since their modern discovery.

== See also ==
- Pulo di Altamura
- Paleoanthropology
- Peștera cu Oase
- Peștera Muierilor
