= Pulo di Altamura =

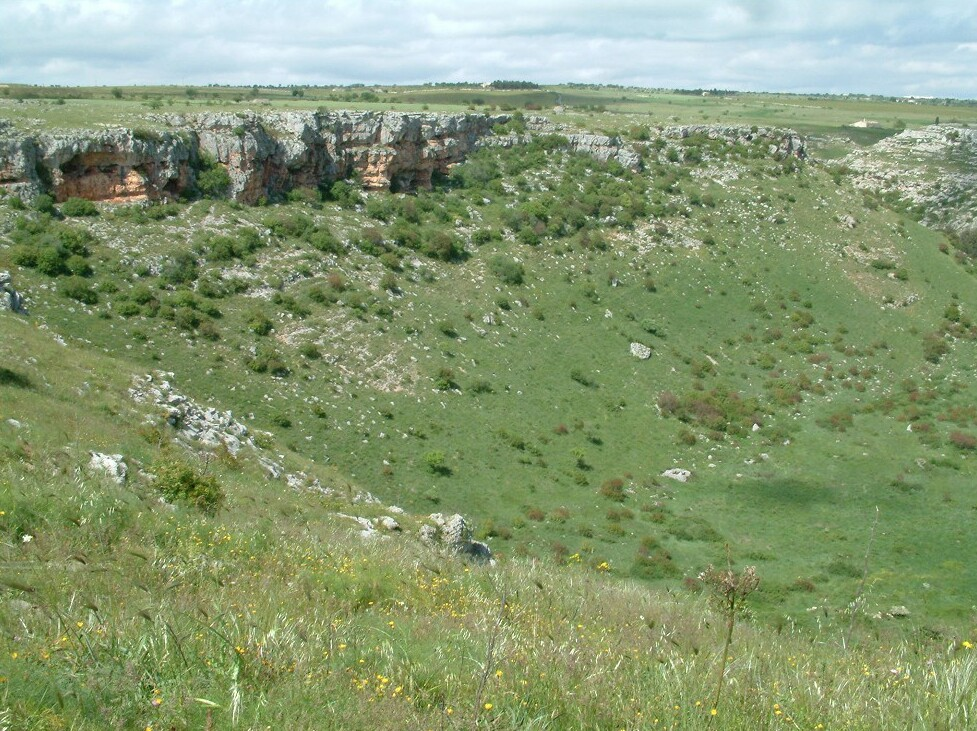
- Pulo di Altamura

- Location within Italy
- Location: Altamura, Apulia, Italy
- Coordinates: 40°53′22″N 16°34′05″E
- Depth: 70–75 meters (230–246 ft)
- Length: 450–500 meters (1,480–1,640 ft)
- Discovery: Already well known among Altamura inhabitants before 1688.
- Geology: karst

Pulo di Altamura is a doline located on the Murge plateau (Apulia, Italy). It is the largest doline in that region and it is located about 6 kilometers (3.7 mi) north-west of the city of Altamura. It shares the local toponym pulo with other large dolines of the region, i.e. Pulicchio di Gravina, Pulo di Molfetta and Pulicchio di Toritto.

== Dimensions ==
The perimeter, measured on the edge of the doline, is around 1,800 meters (5,900 ft). The larger diameter is abit bigger than 500 meters (1,600 ft) and it is never lower than 450 meters (1,480 ft). The depth is around 70–75 meters (230–246 ft).

== Etymology ==
The etymology of toponym pulo is currently unknown. It is used only in the Murge plateau to denote a doline, while it is unused in other regions of Apulia. The term is also used for the nearby dolines Pulo di Molfetta, Pulicchio di Gravina and Pulicchio di Toritto (pulicchio means small pulo), and it is attested as early as in the 17th century, since Domenico Santoro in 1688 wrote "luogo detto dalli Cittadini lo Pulo" (place called by Altamura people 'Pulo').

Some geologists noted an assonance with the Slavonic term polje (which means "field" and which denotes karst forms consisting of large flat spaces) which, while denoting something different from pulo, may have a common origin with this. Equally possible seems an Indo-European common root, from *polŭ ("open"). Nonetheless, it appears unlikely that there could be an affinity between the two terms, especially if it turns out that the toponym polje is relatively recent.

== Scientific research ==
Lorenzo Giustiniani, in his work Dizionario geografico del Regno di Napoli (1797), suggested that Pulo di Altamura may have originated from "underground fire" (Italian: fuoco sotterraneo) and from earthquakes, thus hypothesizing a tectonic and volcanic genesis.

Previously, a few other scientists and geologists had only cited a natural cavity near Altamura. Naturalist Giuseppe Maria Giovene (1784) noticed that, unlike Pulo di Molfetta, the caves of Pulo di Altamura did not contain saltpetre. Among others, Flores (1899) stated that he had heard about "a large doline located near Altamura". T. Vespasiani (1901) also cited the doline.

The first thorough scientific study on Pulo di Altamura (until then completely unknown among geologists and naturalists) was carried out by Carmelo Colamonico (1917), who first formulated a consistent scientific theory about the origin of the doline.

== Origin and evolution ==
A few hypotheses have been formulated about the origin of this doline, some of which are more plausible than others, but almost all of them are based on karst processes. Some pseudoscientific theories incorrectly trace the origin of the doline to a meteorite or to unspecified subsidence phenomena.

The origin of Pulo di Altamura, as well as that of the other dolines in Apulia pulicchio di Gravina, pulo di Molfetta, Gurio Lamanna, grave Tre Paduli) can be easily explained through karst processes, that is the double action (mechanical and chemical) of rainwater on the heavily fractured limestone rock of the Murge plateau.

Limeston rock itself is highly impermeable, but if heavily fractured, it exhibits high permeability, allowing rainwater to infiltrate, to physically erode the rock and also to chemically react with it.

That is why the region of Murge plateau is almost everywhere highly permeable. In this arid region, rivers and lakes are more rare, substituted by the so-called lama, very common in Murge. Lamas are furrows due to the erosion of rainwater and they are confused with rivers. In lamas, only a small fraction of the total amount of rainwater flows on top of it, while the remaining part infiltrates and flows underground as groundwater, following almost the same direction (horizontally) as the lama.

Pulo di Altamura is the lowest point of a vast rainwater drainage basin. The rainwater of the drainage basin reaches Pulo di Altamura through two main lamas, one in direction North North-East and the other in direction North-West.

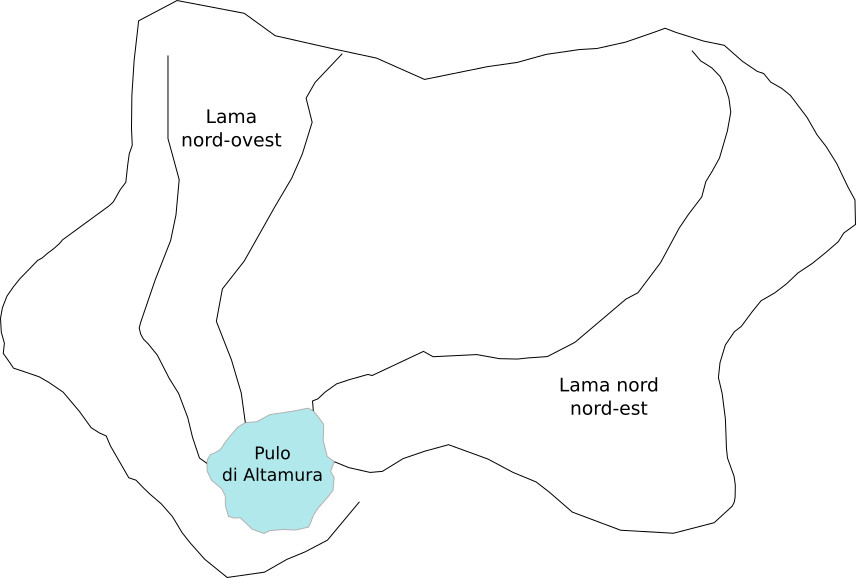
The drainage basin, of which Pulo di Altamura is the endpoint (lowest point)

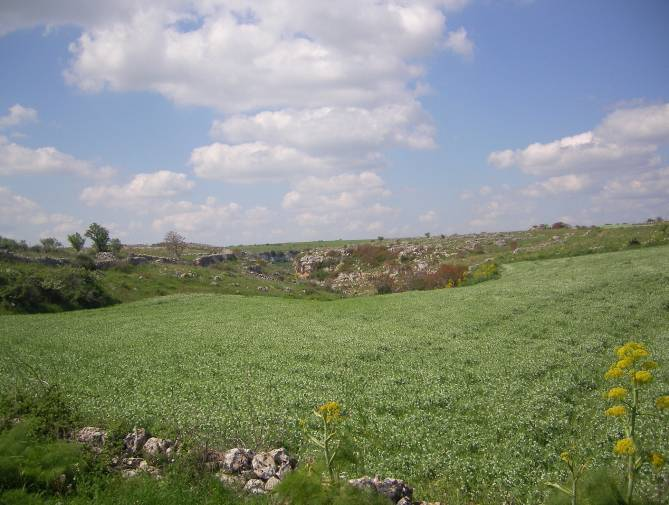
Pulo di Altamura - NNE lama

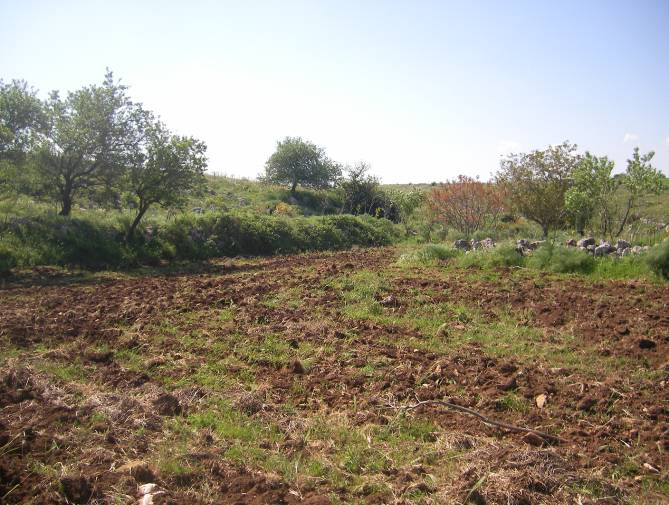
Pulo di Altamura - NW lama

Pulo di Altamura's drainage basin is so big, that it's been defined by Carmelo Colamonico "one of the largest absorption areas in Apulia". The amount of water flowing through the endpoint has formed, over the millennia, the doline, both eroding the rock mechanically and chemically dissolving it.

Moreover, Carmelo Colamonico, in 1917, first hypothesized that a pre-existing cave (acting as a sinkhole) may have collapsed, leading to the formation of the doline. In this case, the doline would fall into the category of the so-called "collapse dolines". Nevertheless, the geologic landform generated in this way would have been so small, that karst action would be necessary to explain the formation of the doline.

== Human presence ==
The northern side of the doline, almost vertical, has many crannies and natural caves, probably inhabited by hominids and prehistoric man. Altamura Man was discovered in an area very close to Pulo di Altamura.

Domenico Santoro, in his essay Description of the city of Altamura (1688), wrote that Saint William of Montevergine had lived as a hermit in one of the caves in the northern side of the doline, even though the primary sources of his statement are currently unknown.

== Caves ==
Pulo di Altamura contains three caves, i.e. "Grotta del colombo", "Grotta dell'imbroglio" and "Grotta dell'orco", located in its northern part.

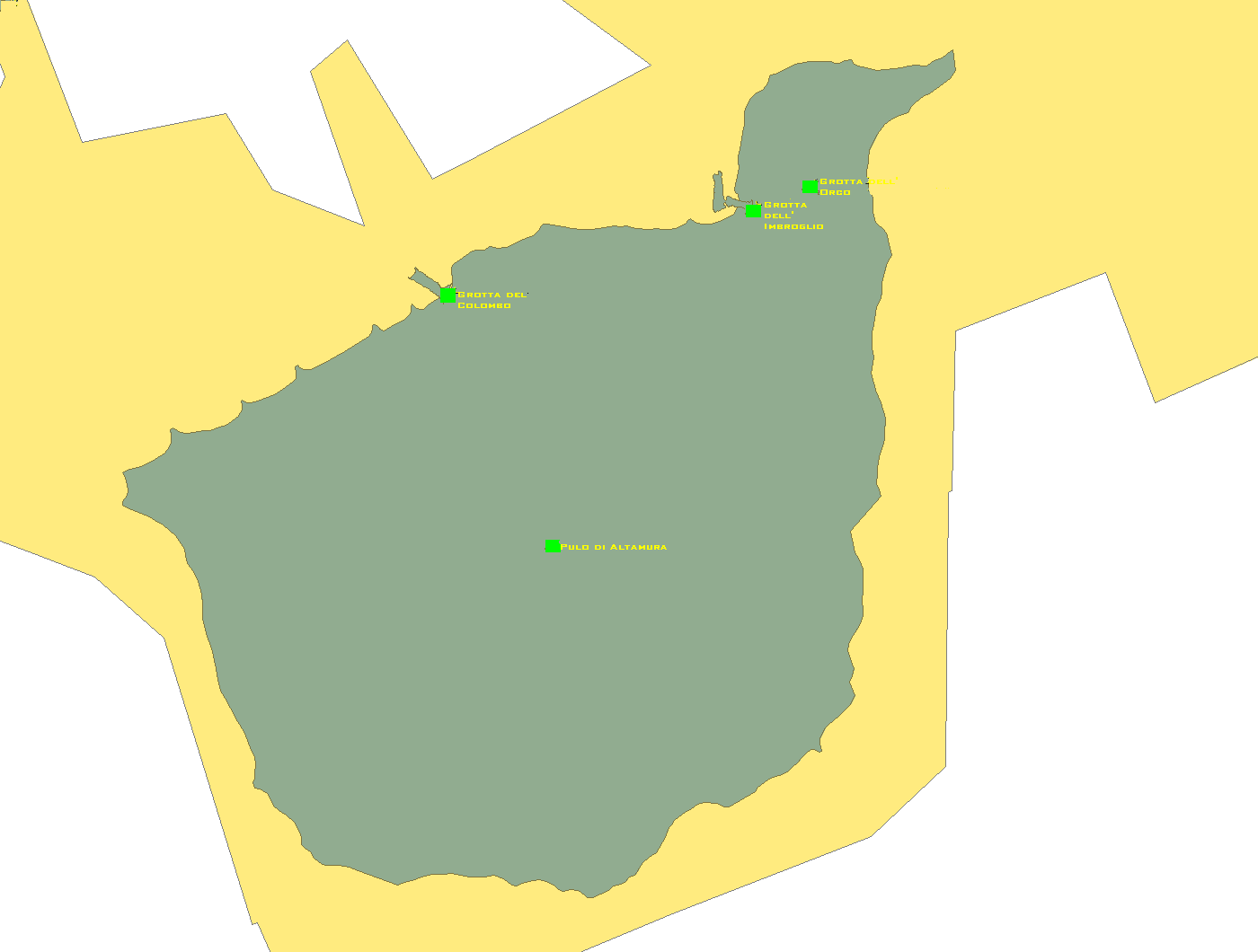
The caves inside Pulo di Altamura

== Flora and fauna ==
Due to the particular shape of its walls and to the very particular microclimate along them and in the crannies of the doline, its habitat is ideal for many species (animals and plants), that are normally uncommon on the Murge plateau. For example, common raven is one of the species that nest on the steep and impervious walls of Pulo di Altamura.

== See also ==
- Altamura
- Altamura Castle
- Altamura Man
- Doline
- Gurio Lamanna
- Karst
- Lama (geology)
- Murge
- Pulicchio di Gravina

== Sources ==
=== Books ===
- Berloco, Tommaso (1985). Storie inedite della città di Altamura (in Italian). Altamura: ATA - Associazione Turistica Altamurana Pro Loco.
- Giuseppe Pupillo; Operatori C.R.S.E.C. BA/7 (2017). Altamura, immagini e descrizioni storiche (PDF). Matera: Antezza Tipografi. ISBN 9788889313282. Archived from the original (PDF) on 2018-10-21.

=== Academic articles ===
- Sergueï Sakhno (2017). "The Lexicon of Slavic". Handbook of Comparative and Historical Indo-European Linguistics. 3. Mouton: W. de Gruyter.
- Mario Parise; Antonio Federico; Marco Delle Rose; Mariangela Sammarco (2003). "Karst terminology in Apulia" (PDF). Acta Carsologica.
- Colamonico, Carmelo (1917). "Il pulo di Altamura". Mondo Sotterraneo (in Italian). Udine: Tipografia Domenico Del Bianco.
- Giuseppe Maria Giovene (7 August 1784). Lettera del Sig. canonico D. Giuseppe Maria Giovene, Vicario generale di Molfetta, al Sig. Abate Alberto Fortis, contenente varie osservazioni sulla nitrosità naturale della Puglia. Molfetta.
- T. Vespasiani (1901). "Le Murge e la città di Altamura". Rassegna Pugliese (in Italian). XVIII (9). Trani (Bari).
- E. Flores (1899). "Appunti di geologia pugliese". Rassegna Pugliese (in Italian). Trani (Bari): Vecchi.
