= Murgese =

Breed of horse

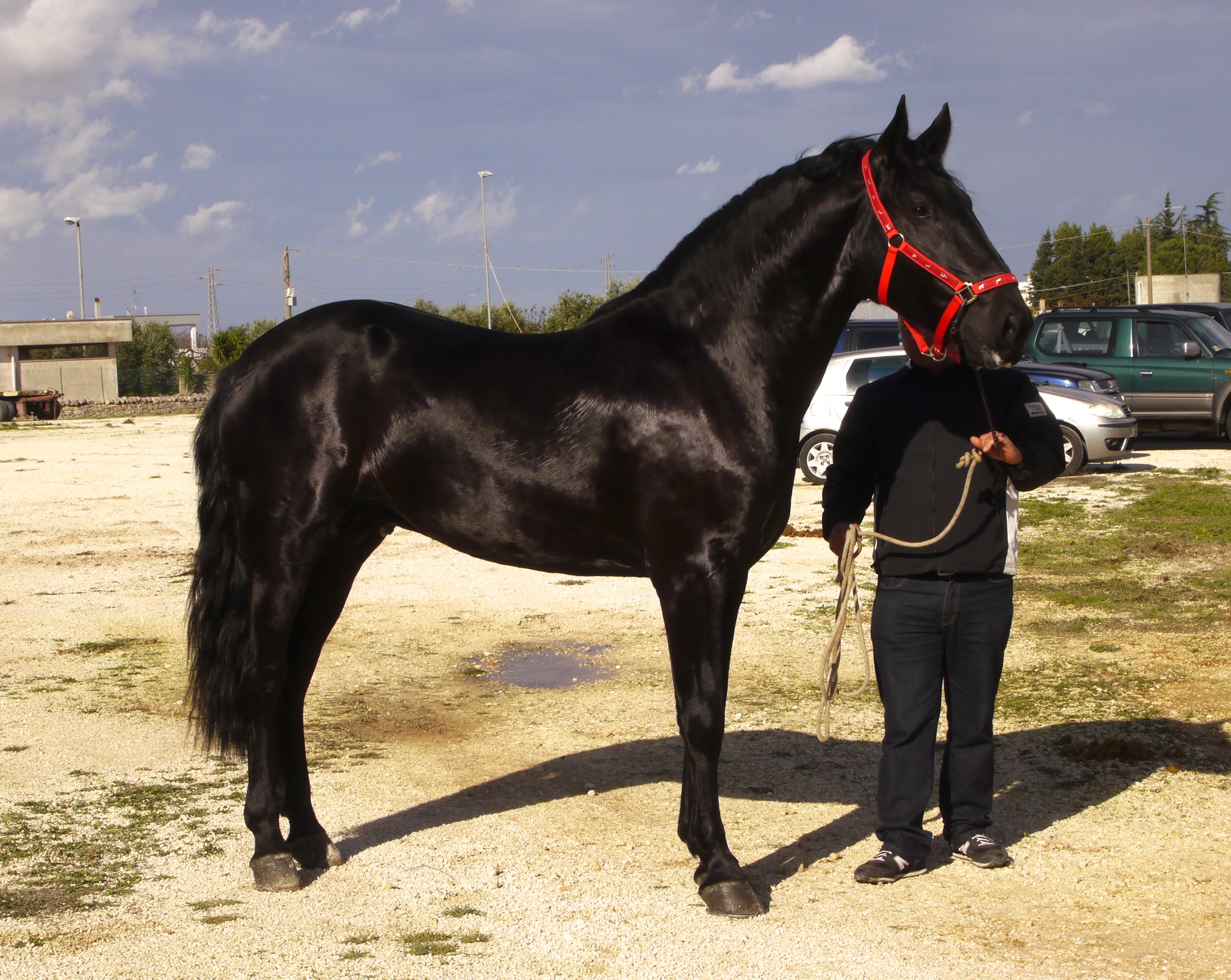
- A young stallion
- Conservation status: FAO (2007): not at risk; DAD-IS (2023): at risk/vulnerable
- Other names: Cavallo Murgese; Cavallo delle Murge
- Country of origin: Italy
- Standard: Associazione Nazionale Allevatori del Cavallo delle Murge e dell'Asino di Martina Franca (in Italian)
- Use: riding

Traits
- Height: Male: 155–168 cm; Female: 150–162 cm

The Murgese is an Italian breed of riding horse. It is named for its area of origin, the plateau of Le Murge in southern Italy, most of which lies in the region of Puglia. It was formerly used as an agricultural or military horse; selection for a lighter type more suitable for riding began in the second half of the twentieth century.

== History ==
The Murgese originates on the calcareous plateau of Le Murge in southern Italy, most of which lies in the region of Puglia. It is particularly associated with the wooded pastures of the rural areas surrounding the town and comune of Martina Franca, and also with the comuni of Alberobello, Ceglie Messapico, Cisternino, Locorotondo and Noci.

The Murgese breed originated in Italy during the period of Spanish rule. It is thought that they were developed by crossing Barb and Arabian horses imported by the Count of Conversano.

Registration and selective breeding of the modern Murgese began in 1926 at the Regio Deposito Stalloni or royal stud of Foggia, which later became the Istituto di Incremento Ippico for Puglia. The initial foundation stock consisted of 9 stallions and 46 mares. Three stallions – Granduca di Martina (1919–1944), Araldo delle Murge (1928–1949) and Nerone (1934–1946) – were particularly influential in the development of the breed.

A breed society, the Associazione Regionale Allevatori dell'Asino di Martina Franca e del Cavallo delle Murge, was established in 1948; the name was changed in 1990 to Associazione Nazionale Allevatori dell'Asino di Martina Franca e del Cavallo delle Murge. A study published in 2005 found inbreeding in the Murgese to be at an acceptable level.

== Characteristics ==
The horses usually stand between 150 and 168 centimetres (14.3 and 16.2 hands) at the withers, and may be black, or dark roan. The head is light, with a straight or slightly convex profile, a broad forehead, and sometimes a prominent jaw. The neck is sturdy and broad at the base, the withers pronounced, the chest well-developed, and the shoulders sloping. The croup is long and broad and can be either flat or sloping. The legs are strong with large joints. The hooves are black and extremely hard, a feature for which the breed is famous.

== Use ==
Murgese horses are generally used for trekking and cross-country riding, although they have also traditionally been used for farm work and light draft work. They are still popular on small farms where they are sought for their multi-purpose usefulness. The ancestors of the Murgese influenced the Lipizzaner, through the stallions Neapolitano and Conversano (two founding stallions of the Lipizzaner breed), and many were exported to Spain and to Northern Europe where they influenced the development of breeds such as Frederiksborg horse and Kladruber.
