= Pulicchio di Gravina =

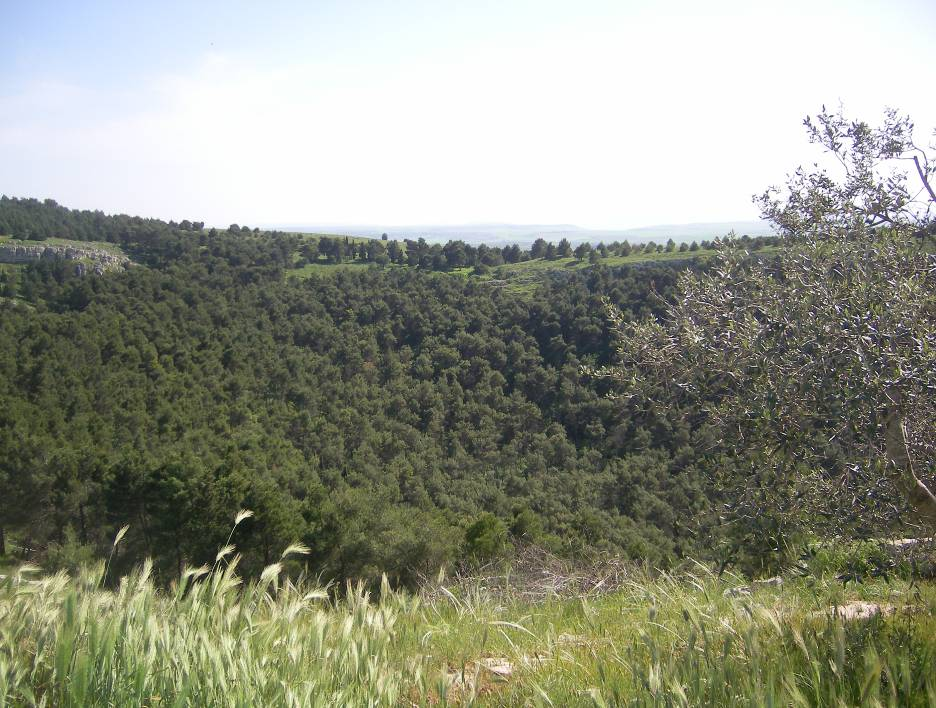
- Pulicchio di Gravina

- Location within Italy
- Location: Altamura, Apulia, Italy
- Coordinates: 40°54′15″N 16°25′21″E
- Depth: 87 meters (285 ft)
- Length: 400–530 meters (1,310–1,740 ft)
- Geology: Karst

Pulicchio di Gravina (in the local dialect Pulícchie or Pulidde) is the second-largest doline in the Murge plateau (in Apulia, southern Italy) after Pulo di Altamura. It falls into the territory of Gravina in Puglia, located about 10 kilometers (6.2 mi) north of the latter, close to the border with Altamura's territory. It shares the local toponym pulo with other large dolines of the region, i.e. Pulo di Altamura, Pulo di Molfetta and Pulicchio di Toritto.

The doline is very close to other two karst landforms, Gurio Lamanna and Tre Paduli.

== Dimensions ==
The doline is shaped like an egg and it is highly regular, with the slope almost constant on all its sides (as shown on the map's level curves). The biggest length (in direction NNW-SE) is equal to 530 meters (1,740 ft). The doline is somewhat wider in the northern part (400 meters (1,300 ft)) than in the southern part (360 meters (1,180 ft)). Its perimeter is approximately 1,600 meters (5,200 ft), while the maximum depth is 87 meters (285 ft). The lowest point has height 477.5 meters (1,567 ft) from the sea level. Therefore, the doline is smaller but a little deeper than Pulo di Altamura.

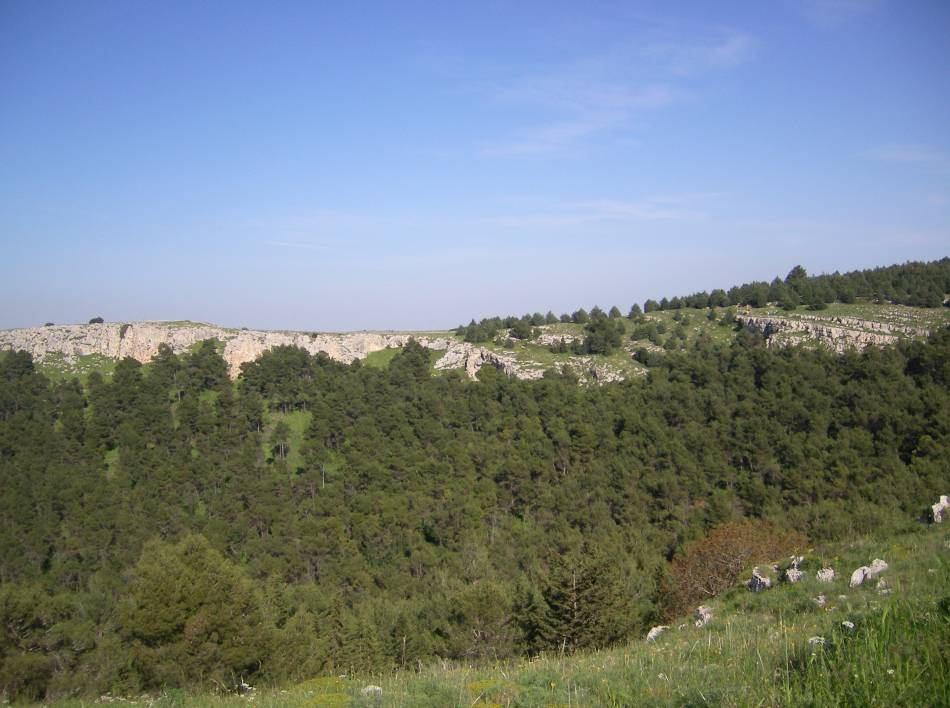
View of Pulicchio di Gravina

== Etymology ==
The etymology of toponym pulo is currently unknown. It is used only in the Murge plateau to denote a doline, and not in other regions of Apulia. The term is also used for the nearby dolines Pulo di Altamura, Pulo di Molfetta, and Pulicchio di Toritto (pulicchio means small pulo), and it is attested as early as in the 17th century, since Domenico Santoro in 1688, referring to Pulo di Altamura, wrote "luogo detto dalli Cittadini lo Pulo" (place called by Altamura people 'Pulo').

== History of scientific research on Pulicchio di Gravina ==
Te first thorough scientific study on Pulicchio di Gravina (until then completely unknown among geologists and naturalists) dates back to Carmelo Colamonico (1917).

Previously, a few other scientists and geologists had only cited a natural cavity near Altamura. For instance, F. Virgilio (1900) briefly mentions the doline calling it "pulicchio" and incorrectly traces its origin to an unspecified "underground water erosion". According to Virgilio, the absence of rock masses at the bottom of the doline proves that subsidence occurred due to "underground water erosion".

Carmelo Colamonico refutes F. Virgilio's theory pointing out that the absence of rock masses at the bottom of the doline proves, instead, that the origin is due to "superficial erosion".

== Origin and evolution ==
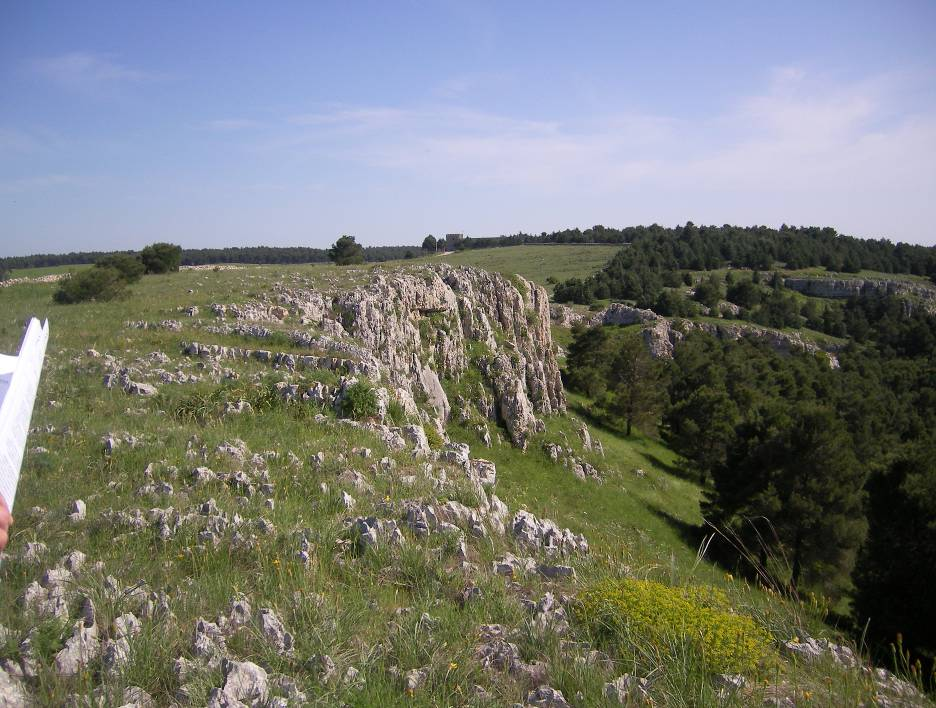
Lateral rock on one of the sides of the doline

In the same way as Pulo di Altamura and Gurio Lamanna, the origin of Pulicchio di Gravina can be explained through karst processes, i.e. the physical (erosion) and chemical (dissolution) action of rainwater, that the fractured limestone rock of the Murge plateau underwent over the millennia (and it still continues).

Unlike other karst dolines of the region (such as Pulo di Altamura), Pulicchio di Gravina is the endpoint of a very small drainage basin and therefore the amount of rainwater collected inside the doline is very little. Carmelo Colamonico points out that not even the rainwater falling on the area close to the doline manages to reach it (at least not superficially). The scarce rainwater is absorbed very quickly. Some farmers of that region stated that "there is never water at the bottom of Pulicchio di Gravina". Furthermore, no noteworthy sinkholes have been discovered inside the doline.

Carmelo Colamonico argues that Pulicchio di Gravina originated mainly due to superficial erosion (and, partly, also the chemical dissolution of the limestone). Nevertheless, just the superficial erosion would not explain both its large size and the proximity to other two dolines, Gurio Lamanna and Tre Paduli. It cannot be excluded the drainage basin of Pulicchio di Gravina may have been larger than today's and it may have been reduced due to the formation of the other two nearby dolines. Nevertheless, the absence of lamas near Pulicchio di Gravina does not seem to confirm this hypothesis. The lama (or lamas) may have been eroded due to the formation of the nearby Gurio Lamanna and Tre Paduli.

Another hypothesis is that it might be a "collapse doline", i.e. a doline generated due to the collapse of the ceiling of a pre-existing cave. Even if it is assumed that the origin of the doline was caused by the collapse of a cave, the initial size of it would have been so small that in any case it is necessary to introduce karst action (rainwater) in order to explain the origin of the doline.

== Afforestation ==
As shown on the photo published by Carmelo Colamonico (1917), Pulicchio di Gravina originally did not have any trees inside. In the 1950s, a forest was established.

== See also ==
- Gravina in Puglia
- Gurio Lamanna
- Altamura
- Pulo di Altamura
- Karst
- Lama (geology)

== Bibliography ==
- Virgilio, F. (1900). "Geomorfogenia della provincia di Bari". Terra di Bari (in Italian). 3. Trani: Vecchi.
- Colamonico, Carmelo (1917). "Il pulicchio di Gravina". Rivista geografica italiana (in Italian) (XXIV). Udine.
- Gortani, Michele. "Appunti per una classificazione delle doline". Mondo Sotterraneo (in Italian). Udine.
- Berloco, Tommaso (1985). Storie inedite della città di Altamura (in Italian). Altamura: ATA - Associazione Turistica Altamurana Pro Loco.
