= Altopiano delle Murge =

Plateau in southern Italy

Coordinates: 40°58′34″N 16°24′22″E

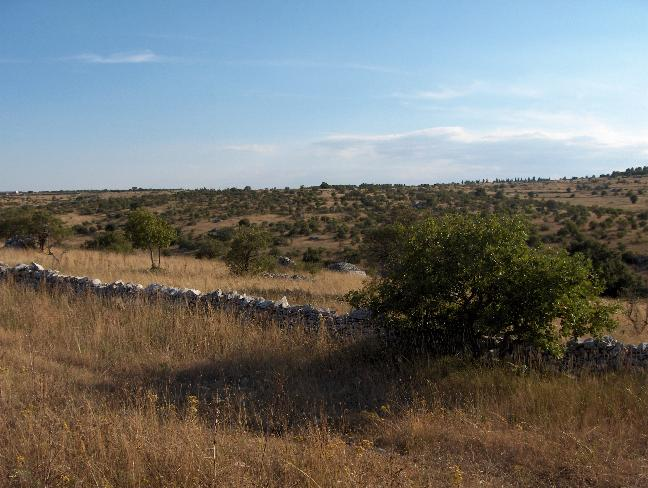
Landscape of the Murge plateau

The Altopiano delle Murge (Italian for 'plateau of the Murge') is a karst topographic plateau of rectangular shape in southern Italy. Most of it lies within the region of Puglia and corresponds with the sub-region known as Murgia or Le Murge, within the administrative area of the Metropolitan City of Bari, the province of Barletta-Andria-Trani, the provinces of Brindisi and Taranto to the south, and the Matera in the region of Basilicata to the west. The name is believed to originate from the Latin: murex, meaning 'sharp stone'.

== Geography and geology ==
The Murge plateau covers a surface of some 4000 km^{2} (1500 sq mi) bordered by the Ofanto river and the Tavoliere delle Puglie plain to the north, by the Adriatic Sea to the northeast, and by the Messapic depression, which separates it from the Salento peninsula, to the south. It is usually divided into Alta Murgia (High Murgia), the highest area, with poorer vegetation, and Bassa Murgia (Lower Murgia), with more fertile land, extensively planted with olive-trees for the production of olives.

The plateau is geologically homogeneous to a great extent, and lies mostly on the limestone formations of Calcare di Ban and Calcare di Altamura, with terra rossa deposits present in the sequence. The rocks are mostly Cretacic limestone, so that karst landscapes prevail in the area, with doline fields, some large dolines, sinkholes, and caves. The largest dolines are near Altamura, Gravina, and Molfetta. The large karstic doline of Molfetta is known locally as the 'Pulo' and lies south-west of the town, near the Adriatic coast, taking the form of an oval-shaped depression with a depth of some thirty metres. Near Castellana Grotte are the Castellana Caves, the most important in the region. The highest point of the plateau is called Monte Caccia, at 679 m.

The climate is cold in winter, with average temperatures in the 1-6 °C range. In summer, they rise up to 30 °C. Rain, unlike in the arid Salento nearby, has an annual average of about 950 mm.

== Economy ==
Historically, the Murge have been the seat of transhumance practice in animal husbandry, since at least the first millennium BC, with cattle being moved to Abruzzo in summer, and southwards during winter.

Until the 19th century, agriculture was characterized by large latifundia, owned by a few landowners, and the relative lack of water, forming part of a region sometimes called "the feudal South". Present-day economic activities include marble quarries, and the production of olives, wine, almonds, cherries, and mulberries. The animals grazed include sheep, goats, domestic pigs, and cattle.

A local breed of horse, known as Murgese, has been bred here since the Middle Ages. In the 15th and 16th centuries, the breed was ridden by Italian knights. In later centuries, the Murgese almost died out, but was revived in the 1920s.

== See also ==
- Pulo di Altamura
- Pulicchio di Gravina
- Gurio Lamanna
- Altamura
- Gravina in Puglia
- Alta Murgia National Park
- Lama (geology)
- Karst
