= Gravina in Puglia =

Gravina in Puglia Gravéine (Neapolitan)
- Comune
- Comune di Gravina in Puglia
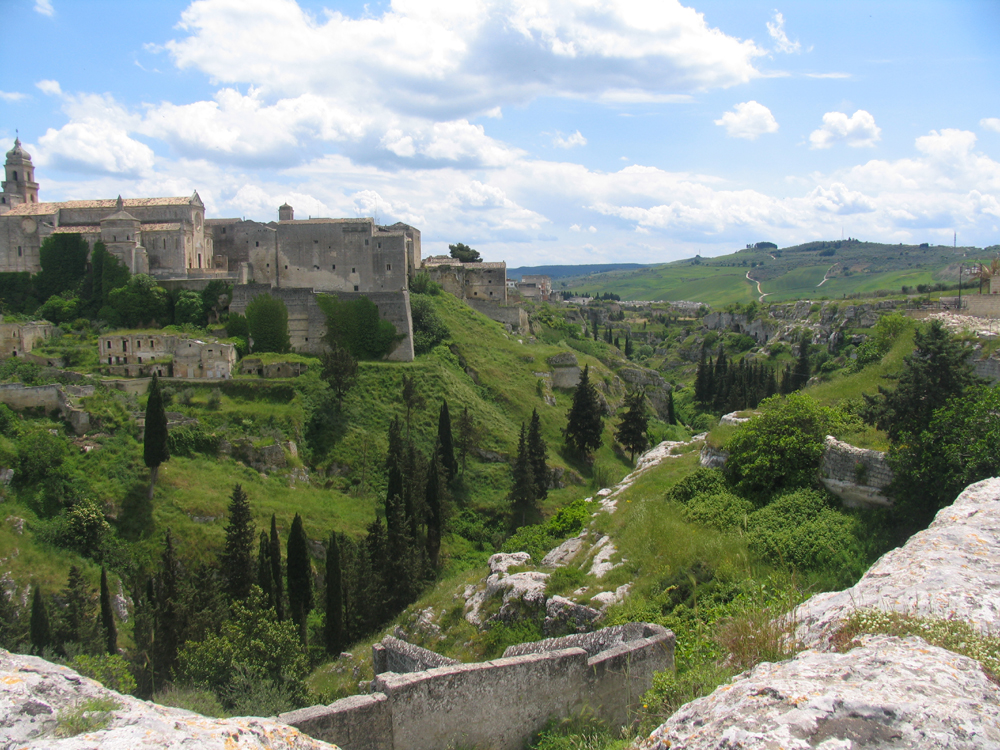
- Panorama of Gravina in Puglia

- Coat of arms

- Location within Italy Location within Apulia
- Coordinates: 40°49′N 16°25′E
- Country: Italy
- Region: Apulia
- Metropolitan city: Bari (BA)
- Frazioni: Murgetta, Dolcecanto, Pantanella

Government
  - Mayor: Fedele Lagreca (PD)

Area
  - Total: 384.73 km^{2} (148.55 sq mi)
- Elevation: 338 m (1,109 ft)

Population (31 August 2017)
  - Total: 43,775
  - Density: 113.78/km^{2} (294.69/sq mi)
- Demonym: Gravinesi
- Time zone: UTC+1 (CET)
  - Summer (DST): UTC+2 (CEST)
- Postal code: 70024
- Dialing code: 080
- Patron saint: Michael the Archangel, St. Philip Neri
- Saint day: September 29
- Website: Official website

Gravina in Puglia (Italian: [ɡraˈviːna im ˈpuʎʎa]; Barese: Gravéine [ɡraˈviːnə, ɡraˈvejnə]; Latin: Silvium; Ancient Greek: Σιλούϊον, romanized: Siloúïon) is a town and comune (municipality) of the Metropolitan City of Bari, Apulia, southern Italy.

The word gravina comes from the Latin grava or from the Messapic graba, with the meaning of 'rock', 'shaft' and 'erosion of bank river'. Other words that share the same root are grava, gravaglione and gravinelle. Alternatively, when the emperor Frederick II went to Gravina, because of the large extension of the lands and for the presence of wheat, he decided to give to it the motto Grana dat et vina, that is to say It offers wheat and wine. Gravina is the home of the Alta Murgia National Park.

Gravina in Puglia is a member of Cittaslow.

== History ==
Thanks to its strategic position, Gravina has a very ancient history. Its territory has been inhabited since the Paleolithic, due to the high presence of water and woods. The largest remains date back to the Neolithic. The oldest settlements have been identified in the districts of Botromagno, S.Paolo, Vagnari, S.Stefano and S.Staso (early Christian). The town has been known with the names Sidis (Σίδις), Sylbion (Σιλβìον), Sidio, Silvium, Petramagna or Botromagno (name of the hill where the ancient inhabited area has developed). An important find of a skeleton belonging to an Asiatic man in the Vagnari necropolis testifies the existence of relations between the town of Gravina and the Far East already in 200 BCE.

Part of the Magna Graecia region, the town was colonized by the Greeks and became a polis with the right to mint its own coinage. Diodorus notes it as an Apulian town, which was wrested from the Samnites by the Romans during the 3rd Samnite War (305 or 306 BCE). It was a town in the interior of Apulia. It is noticed by Strabo as the frontier town of the Peucetii, and its name is noticed by Pliny among the municipal towns of Apulia. The Via Appia, which linked Rome to Brindisi, passed through Gravina. The Itineraries place it 20 miles (32 km) from Venusia, on the branch of the Appian Way which led direct to Tarentum.

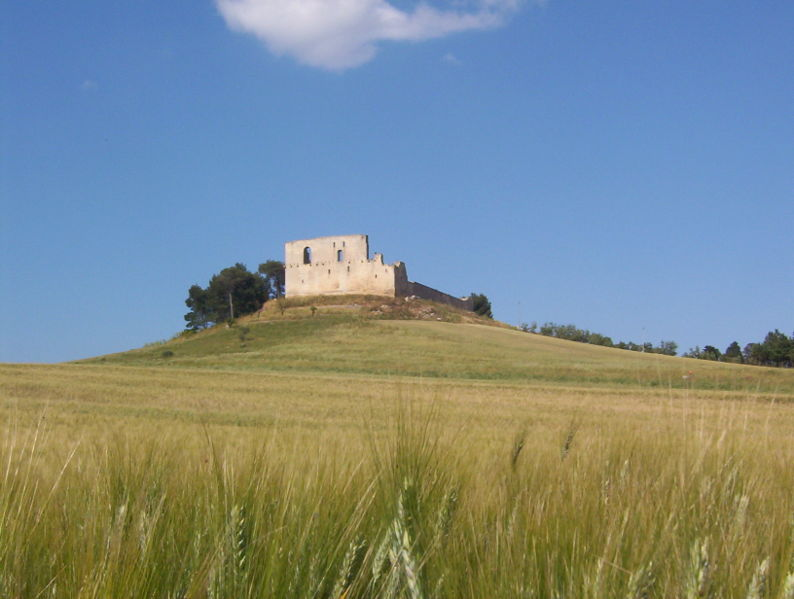
The ruins of Frederick II's castle in Gravina in Puglia

Later it was ruled by Byzantines, Lombards and North African Muslims.

The town was the site of a Norman countship in the Hauteville Kingdom of Sicily and in the later Kingdom of Naples. A famous count of the former was Gilbert, who was sent by his cousin, the Queen regent Margaret of Navarre to the peninsula to combat the Holy Roman Emperor. In the latter period it was the hereditary fief of John, Duke of Durazzo. The Normans called the town Garagnone or Garaynone.

From 1386 to 1816 it was a fief of the Orsini family: the pope Benedict XIII (Pietro Francesco Orsini-Gravina) was born here in 1649. Feudal oppression led to numerous riots, in particular from 1789 until the unification of Italy (1861).

Gravina in Puglia was partly destroyed by Allied bombings during World War II.

== Main sights ==
- Gravina Cathedral (11th-12th centuries) – built by the Normans in Romanesque style. Destroyed by fires and earthquakes in the mid-15th century, it houses a splendid reliquary of an arm of the English Thomas Becket, obtained by Bishop Roberto in 1179.
- The remains of Frederick II's castle, site on a hill nearby the town, originally a base for bird hunting. According to Giorgio Vasari, it was designed in 1231 by one Fuccio from Florence.
- San Francesco – late 15th-early 16th-century church
- Sant'Agostino – church with a simple white façade
- Madonna delle Grazie – Baroque-style church with an unusual façade sporting a rose window surrounded by a large carved eagle, coat of arms of the Giustiniani.
- San Sebastiano – Renaissance-style church with a nave and two aisles separated by pilasters. The cloister of the annexed convent has with Romanesque capitals decorated with animal and vegetable figures.
- San Michele delle Grotte – 10th-century church carved out from the tuff rocks (one of the Chiese rupestri)

It has also a well preserved bridge, in tourist guides sometimes mistakenly called the "Roman bridge" but actually dating much later. It was first mentioned in 1686. Following the earthquake of 1722, the bridge was restored and transformed into an aqueduct by the Orsini family of Rome, who then moved to Gravina around the middle of the 18th century.

== Culture ==
Gravina in Puglia is famous for one of the oldest fairs in Europe: the Saint George's Fair has been held each April since 1294.

Gravina's cuisine, one of Apulia's most traditional ones, is based on three typical agricultural products found within the surrounding region of Apulia, namely wheat, olive oil and wine. The local cuisine is also enriched by the wide variety of fruit and vegetables produced locally.

The town is also known for a particular cheese, named "Pallone di Gravina".

=== Gravina DOC ===
The commune of Gravina in Puglia produces a white denominazione di origine controllata (DOC) Italian wine that can be made in a still or sparkling Spumante style. While the still Gravina wine is almost always dry, the sparkling Gravina wine can be made in both a dry secco and slightly sweet amabile style. All grapes destined for DOC wine production need to be harvested to a yield no greater than 15 tonnes/ha. The wine is made primarily (40-65%) from Malvasia del Chianti, Greco di Tufo and Bianco d'Alessano with the last two grape varieties collectively permitted to make up between 35 and 60% of the blend. Bombino bianco, Trebbiano Toscano and Verdeca are also permitted up to a maximum of 10%. The finished wine must attain a minimum alcohol level of 11% in order to be labelled with the Gravina DOC designation.

== People ==
- Domenico Cennini (1606–1684), Bishop of Gravina in Puglia from 1645 to 1684, died in Gravina
- Francesco Guarino (1611–1651), painter, died in Gravina
- Domenico Valvassori (1627–1689), Bishop of Gravina in Puglia from 1686 to 1689, died in Gravina
- Pope Benedict XIII (1649–1730), pope from 1724 to 1730, born in Gravina
- Salvatore Fighera (1771–1837), classical composer, born in Gravina
- Giuseppe Tarantino (1857–1950), philosopher and rector at the University of Pisa, born in Gravina
- Francesco Schittulli (born 1946), surgeon and politician, born in Gravina

== See also ==
- Pulicchio di Gravina
- Roman Catholic Diocese of Gravina-Montepeloso
- Pallone di Gravina
