= Pulo di Molfetta =

Doline in Molfetta, Italy

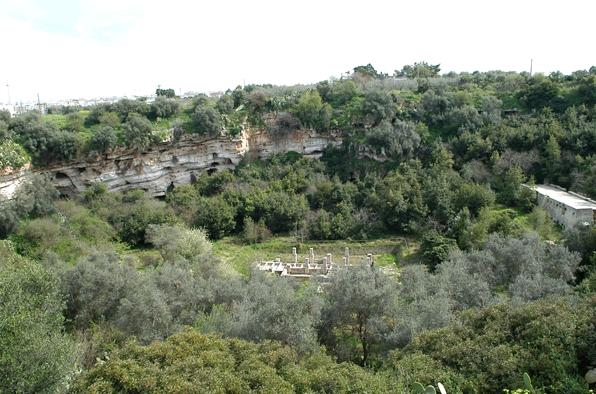
- Pulo di Molfetta

- Location within Italy
- Location: Molfetta, Apulia, Italy
- Coordinates: 41°11′41″N 16°34′32″E
- Depth: 30 meters (98 ft)
- Geology: karst

Pulo di Molfetta is a doline located on the Murge plateau, in Apulia, southern Italy, around 1.5 kilometers (0.93 mi) south-west of the city of Molfetta. It originated due to the collapse of the ceiling of one or more caves. It shares the local toponym pulo with other large dolines of the region, i.e. Pulicchio di Gravina, Pulo di Molfetta and Pulicchio di Toritto.

== See also ==
- Pulo di Altamura
- Pulicchio di Gravina
- Gurio Lamanna
- Molfetta

== Sources ==
- Berloco, Tommaso (1985). Storie inedite della città di Altamura. ATA - Associazione Turistica Altamurana Pro Loco.
