= Tonograph =

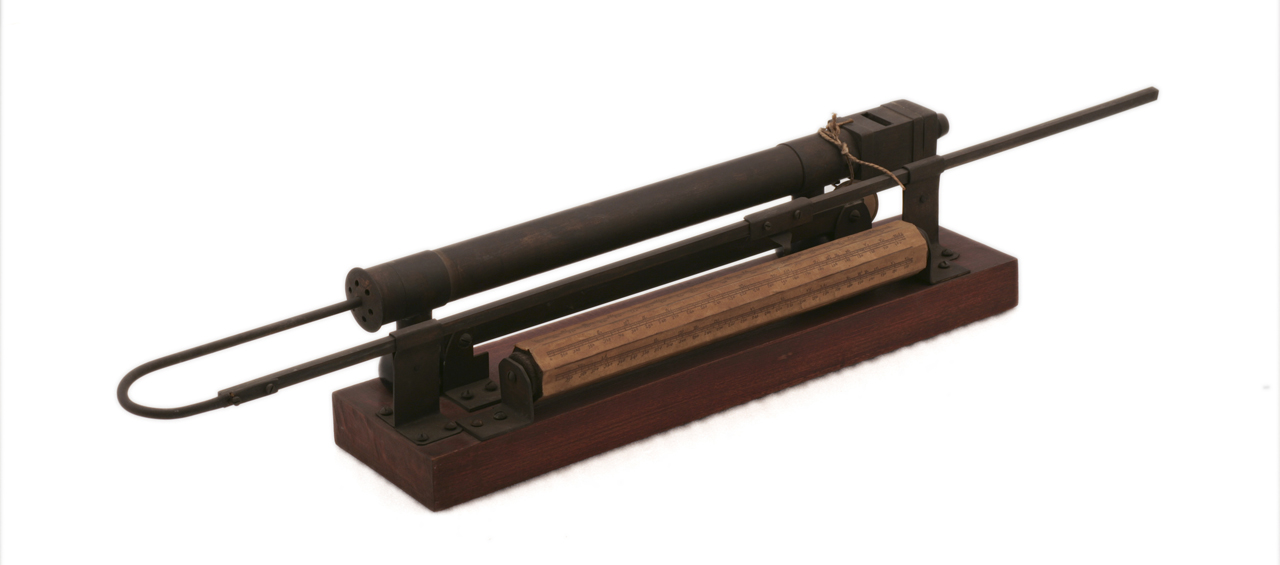
The tonograph, presented in 1841 by Cagnazzi and stored in the Museo Nazionale Scienza e Tecnologia Leonardo da Vinci, Milan

The tonograph (Italian: tonografo) is a device invented by Italian scientist Luca de Samuele Cagnazzi (1764-1852) and presented at the Terza riunione degli scienziati italiani (the "Third Meeting of Italian Scientists"), held in Florence in September 1841. Its purpose is to measure the intonation of the human voice by matching it with the modifiable sound generated by the device itself.

The original device was donated by its inventor Cagnazzi during the Third Meeting of Italian Scientists. After then, the instrument went lost, but in 1932 ca., thanks to the work of a scholar, it was found in a cellar and exhibited at the Museo Galileo, located in Piazza dei Giudici, Florence. The original device is now stored in the Museo Nazionale Scienza e Tecnologia Leonardo da Vinci, Milan. A copy of the device, commissioned by Count Celio Sabini (from Altamura), is now displayed at the museum Archivio Biblioteca Museo Civico in Altamura.

== Making ==
According to Luca de Samuele Cagnazzi's unpublished autobiography La mia vita, the tonograph was made by Cagnazzi himself with his own hands ("colle mie mani") in 1841. He also wrote a short essay about how it worked and its purpose and this work was first written in Latin language and published under the name Tonographiae Excogitatio (1841), since Cagnazzi wanted its invention to be known in what it was then known as Germany. Subsequently, he translated his essay to Italian language on the occasion of the Third Meeting of Italian Scientists, held in Florence, where he presented his invention.

According to Cagnazzi, his device was very much appreciated during the Third Meeting.

== Working principle ==
The tonograph is a device consisting of a hollow brass cylindrical section closed at one end and equipped with a hole. The cylinder is in all respects similar to that of the organs. Through bellows, operated through one's feet, the air flows through the cylindrical tube making a sound. Inside the cylinder there is a piston whose position is regulated by a thin rod and, as the position of the piston changes, the length of the cylinder also changes. As the plunger (and therefore the rod) changes, the instrument will generate a different sound. A graduated scale makes it possible to "measure" the intonation and inflection of human voice, by matching one's voice with the sound made by the device.

The scale provided by Cagnazzi, apparently, also related to the harmonic and diatonic scale employed in music. Cagnazzi assumes that there is roughly an inverse proportionality between the length of a closed cylindrical tube and the sound's frequency. Based on this assumption, he came to define the width of the scale and he related the scale of the device with the scale of music.

The device was meant not only to measure, but also to preserve the tones and inflections of human voice (for example, by transcribing them above or below a text). Therefore, it also represents, in a broad sense, a device which helps store some kind of information.

During the presentation of the device, which took place in 1841 at the Third Meeting of Italian Scientists, during which the device was donated to the department, Professor Giovanni Alessandro Majocchi praised Cagnazzi for his invention, as it provided declamation schools with a way to precisely and successfully store the tone and intensity of human voice. The diatonic and chromatic scales of music didn't have enough notches to accurately represent the tone and intensity of human voice. During the presentation, chemist Giuseppe Gazzeri objected that a mechanical device could never make a sound similar to the human voice, as the material of which the human phonation system is made and the materials of which a mechanical device is made are intrinsically different.

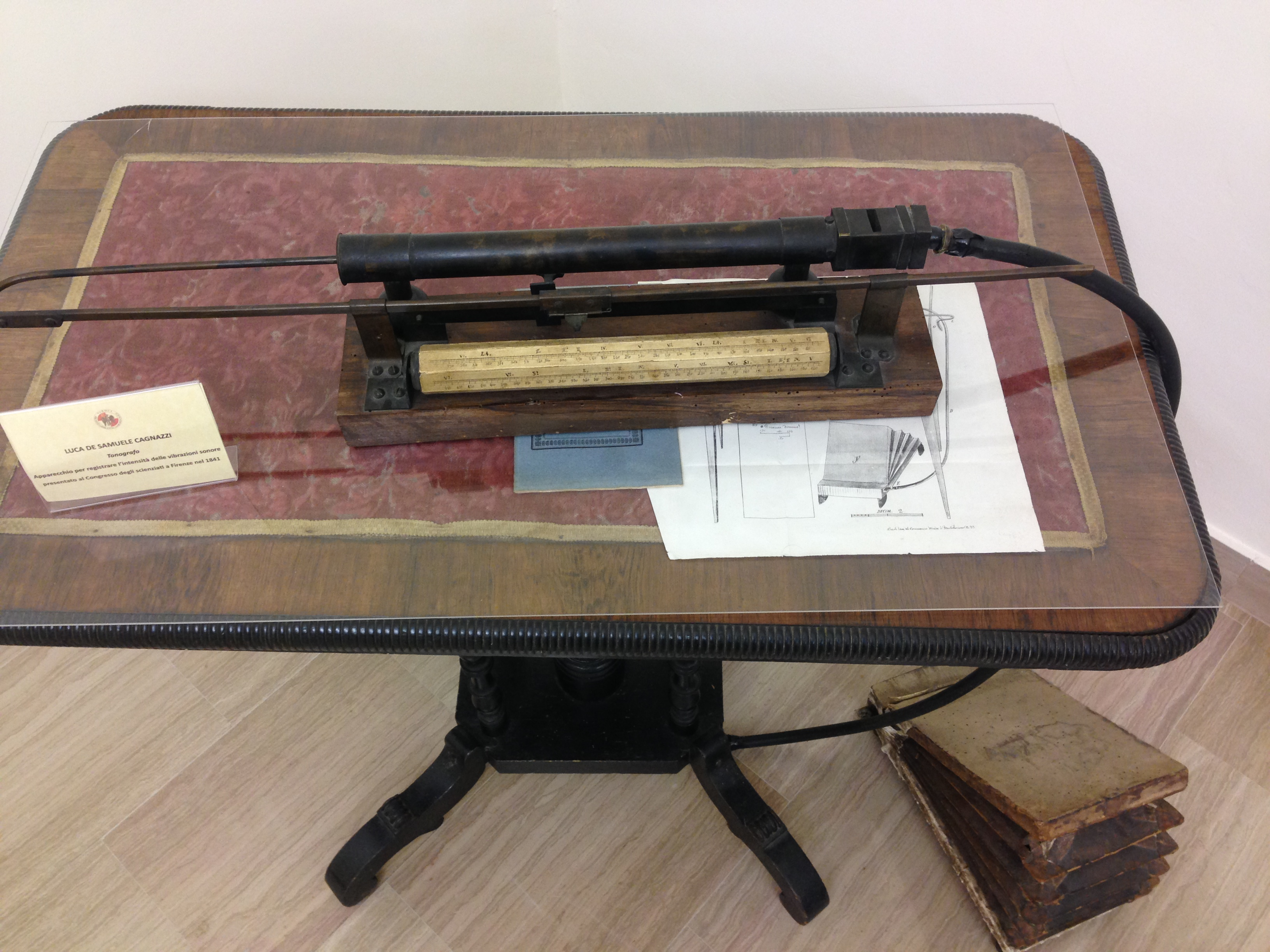
A copy of the tonograph displayed at the museum Archivio Biblioteca Museo Civico, Altamura

Majeri himself replied to Gazzeri's objection by explaining that sound is described by three factors, namely tone, intensity and timbre. The tone depends on the sound's frequency, the intensity is the "strength" of a sound, while the timbre depends on the material of the "sounding body" (Italian: corpo sonante). Different sounds such as a double bass and a bell may have the same tone and intensity, but they are often perceived as different sounds. The difference is given by the timbre. Since intensity and tone but not timbre are meaningful and employed in acting schools, Gazzocchi's objection, according to Majocchi, is unreasonable "by itself".

== Example of use ==
An example of the use of the tonograph is provided by Cagnazzi himself. The syllables of each word and each sentence of a text are pronounced slowly enough, so as to imitate the voice with the device. Once the sound of the device seems closest to the human voice of the syllable, the corresponding value on the scale is transcribed below the syllable. At a lower level, the number of bellows pressures carried out for each word is also added. The "measurement" of the voice requires a lot of diligence and a certain number of attempts before reaching a precise measurement.

Luca de Samuele Cagnazzi provides an example of the use of the tonograph based on a notable verse by Ennius (Andromache):

O pater, O patria, O Priami domus!
180 170 160 165 155 145 170 160 150 160
2 2 1 1

— Luca de Samuele Cagnazzi, Tonografia escogitata (1841), p. 46

From the example above, it is clear that the purpose of the device is to help store the features of human voice, its tones and music. Cagnazzi himself shaped his experiment based on the information provided by Cicero on how the above verse was pronounced in the classical era.

Cagnazzi faces the impossibility (with some exceptions) of faithfully reconstructing the tones and inflections of the voice that the Ancient Greeks and the Romans used in their surviving works. The same inventor, in the first part of his essay Tonografia escogitata (1841) made some acute observations on both linguistics and music; he also explained, in the preface, the purpose of his work as well as of his invention:

Remarkable men in literature and science of the present age, to the extent that my clouded mind allowed me to reach, I managed to lay the foundations for the Tonography: now it is your duty to improve this work; since, if it is not possible to know and imitate the music of the eloquence of the classical age, let the posterity at least know about ours somehow. Live happy.

— Luca de Samuele Cagnazzi, Tonografia escogitata (1841), p. 3.

== Previous attempts ==
According to what reported by its inventor, there had been some previous attempts to faithfully transcribe the tones of acting. Some attempts had been carried out by the Académie des inscriptions et belles-lettres of Paris. Its perpetual secretary Charles Pinot Duclos wrote that abbot Jean-Baptiste Dubos proposed to create a group of experts in the field of music, in order to identify and distinguish fractions of the human voice's diatonic scale.

Nevertheless, the Académie didn't succeed in the above purpose, since human ears (even the ears of the most skilled people) basically can't go beyond a certain level of precision without a proper device. The failure led the Académie to jump to the conclusion that distinguishing between fractions of the diatonic scale was simply impossible, and alternative methods, based on science and mathematics, weren't taken into account. Cagnazzi compared the Académie to the fox in Phaedrus's fable, who said that the grapes were unripe since he couldn't reach it.

== See also ==
- Luca de Samuele Cagnazzi
- Declamation
- Acoustics
- Physics

== Bibliography ==
- Atti della Terza della Riunione degli Scienziati italiani tenuta in Firenze nel settembre del 1841. Florence: Galileiana. 1841. pp. 205–210.
- Annali di fisica, chimica e matematiche col bullettino dell'industria meccanica e chimica. Vol. 3. Milan: Società Tipografia de' Classici Italiani. 1841. pp. 265, 268, 269–270.
- Luca de Samuele Cagnazzi (1841). Tonographiae Excogitatio. Stamperia della Società Filomatica.
- Luca de Samuele Cagnazzi (1841). La tonografia escogitata da Luca de Samuele Cagnazzi. Naples: Stamperia della Società Filomatica.
- Luca de Samuele Cagnazzi (1944). Alessandro Cutolo (ed.). La mia vita. Milano: Ulrico Hoepli. pp. 258, 261–262.
- AA.VV. (2011). Gli strumenti della scienza. Liceo Cagnazzi. Catalogo 1800-1900. Altamura: Torre di Nebbia. p. 224. ISBN 978-88-95911-27-4 – via Issuu.
