= Samuele =

Samuele is the Italian form of the male given name Samuel. It may refer to:

== People ==
=== Given name ===
- Samuele Angori (born 2003), Italian footballer
- Samuele Bacchiocchi (1938–2008), Italian Seventh-day Adventist author and theologian
- Samuele Battistella (born 1998), Italian racing cyclist
- Samuele Beretta (born 1990), Italian footballer
- Samuele Bersani (born 1970), Italian singer-songwriter
- Samuele Bertinelli (born 1976), Italian politician
- Samuele Bettoni (born 1989), Italian footballer
- Samuele Birindelli (born 1999), Italian footballer
- Samuele Burgo (born 1998), Italian canoeist
- Samuele Buttarelli (born 1992), Italian racing driver
- Samuele Campo (born 1995), Swiss footballer
- Samuele Cardinelli (1869–1921), American mobster
- Samuele Ceccarelli (born 2000), Italian sprinter
- Samuele Cerro (born 1995), Italian triple jumper
- Samuele Dalla Bona (born 1981), Italian footballer
- Samuele Damiani (born 1998), Italian footballer
- Samuele Di Benedetto (born 2005), German footballer
- Samuele Inacio (born 2008), Italian footballer
- Samuele Jesi (1786–1853), Italian engraver
- Samuele Levi (1813–1883), Italian composer
- Samuele Locatelli (born 2001), Italian rugby union player
- Samuele Longo (born 1992), Italian footballer
- Samuele Lorenzi (1998–2002), Italian infanticide victim
- Samuele Marzoli (born 1984), Italian racing cyclist
- Samuele Massolo (born 1996), Italian footballer
- Samuele Maurizi (born 1995), Italian footballer
- Samuele Modica (born 1991), Italian footballer
- Samuele Mulattieri (born 2000), Italian footballer
- Samuele Neglia (born 1991), Italian footballer
- Samuele Olivi (born 1980), Italian football manager and former player
- Leo Samuele Olschki (1861–1940), Italian publisher
- Samuele Ortis (born 1996), Italian rugby union player
- Samuele Pace (born 1980), Italian rugby union player
- Samuele Papi (born 1973), Italian volleyball player
- Samuele Parlati (born 1997), Italian footballer
- Samuele Perisan (born 1997), Italian footballer
- Samuele Pizza (born 1988), Italian footballer
- Samuele Porro (born 1988), Italian cross-country mountain biker
- Samuele Preisig (born 1984), Swiss footballer
- Samuele Privitera (2005–2025), Italian racing cyclist
- Samuele Ricci (born 2001), Italian footballer
- Samuele Righetti (born 2001), Italian footballer
- Samuele Rivi (born 1998), Italian racing cyclist
- Samuele Romanin (1808–1861), Italian historian, educator and author
- Samuele Romanini (born 1976), Italian bobsledder
- Samuele Romeo (born 1989), Italian footballer
- Samuele Rossi (born 2001), Seychellois swimmer
- Samuele Schiavina (1971–2016), Italian racing cyclist
- Samuele Segreto (born 2004), Italian dancer and actor
- Samuele Sereni (born 1988), Italian footballer
- Samuele Spalluto (born 2001), Italian footballer
- Samuele Taddei (born 2003), Italian rugby union player
- Samuele Vignato (born 2004) Italian footballer
- Samuele Vita Zelman (1808–1885), Italian author and poet
- Samuele Zannoni (born 2002), Sammarinese footballer
- Samuele Zoccarato (born 1998), Italian racing cyclist

=== Surname ===
- Giuseppe de Samuele Cagnazzi (1763–1837), Italian politician of the Kingdom of Naples
- Luca de Samuele Cagnazzi (1764–1852), Italian Roman Catholic prelate, scientist, mathematician and political economist
  - Liceo classico Luca de Samuele Cagnazzi, a high school in Altamura, Italy

== Other uses ==
- 11622 Samuele, a main-belt asteroid named after Italian amateur astronomer Samuele Marconi
- Samuele (Mayr), a 1821 oratorio by Simon Mayr

== See also ==
- San Samuele
