= Bank of the Tavoliere di Puglia =

The Bank of the Tavoliere di Puglia (Italian: Banca del Tavoliere di Puglia) (1835–1845) was a bank located in the city of Foggia, in the Kingdom of the Two Sicilies . Its purpose was to foster the development of the so-called Tavoliere delle Puglie, one of the poorest areas of the Kingdom of the Two Sicilies, but its hidden purpose was probably to defraud Mr. Van-Aken, an investor from Bruxelles who was planning to invest about two million ducats in the Kingdom of the Two Sicilies on behalf of Dutch and Belgian bankers. As stated by Italian economist Luca de Samuele Cagnazzi, the purpose of all the banks in the Kingdom of the Two Sicilies was to commit some kind of bankruptcy fraud, leading to serious harm to the economy of the kingdom, and this was exacerbarted by widespread corruption in the field of justice.

Right after its establishment, the financial situation of the bank worsened, degenerating into fraudulent bankruptcy, like the vast majority of the banks of the Kingdom of the Two Sicilies. Due to the loss of approximately two million ducats by the Dutch and Belgian bankers, an international crisis arose; the Government of The Hague "sent the baron of Heccheren to Naples in order to negotiate directly with the government and the king of Naples but the local institutions denied the allegations by stating that the government had not taken part in any internal affairs of the bank and therefore they could not be held responsible. The Baron of Heccheren threatened that the "damaged governments" would have used "more effective" methods if the government of Naples had not paid for the damage. According to some sources, the money belonged directly to king William II of the Netherlands.

For a certain period, through a note posted at the Naples Stock Exchange, a sort of alert was issued to the sailors of the Kingdom of the Two Sicilies so that they could take all appropriate measures to deal with any retaliation by Belgians and Dutch (and among these also the possibility of changing the flag of the ship). Despite the publicity made, the warning was not published in the official newspaper of the Kingdom of the Two Sicilies.

While the Baron of Heccheren was negotiating with the government of Naples, the governments of Belgium and Netherlands asked for the intervention of the Pope to resolve the matter and Pope Gregory XVI ordered the nuncio of Naples to speak directly with king Ferdinand II of the Two Sicilies. Nonetheless, the king firmly denied that the government could in any way be held responsible for an investment in which neither the government nor the king had taken part. In 1845 the bank's shareholders "took what remained of their money, losing about eighty percent" of their initial capital of about two million ducats.

== Bibliography ==
- Luca de Samuele Cagnazzi (1820). Sul Tavoliere di Puglia Lettera del Caval. Luca de Samuele Cagnazzi ... al Signor Simonde de Sismondi. Naples: Angelo Trani.
- Antonio Longo (1832). Analisi ragionata delle conseguenze rovinose che produrrebbe l'affrancazione de'canoni fiscali sul Tavoliere di Puglia. Napoli – via Stamperia e cartiera del Fibreno.
- Proposizioni assunte dai portatori delle obbligazioni della pretesa Banca del Tavoliere di Puglia ed osservazioni che combattono tali proposizioni. 1842.
- Atti della fondazione della Banca del Tavoliere di Puglia. Napoli. 1835 – via Tipografia Flautina.
- Luigi Dragonetti (1835). Azioni nazionali della Banca del Tavoliere di Puglia.
- Luca de Samuele Cagnazzi (1944). Alessandro Cutolo (ed.). La mia vita. Milano. pp. 221–224 – via Ulrico Hoepli.
- "Delle società anonime". Codice per Lo Regno delle Due Sicilie - Parte Quinta - Leggi di Eccezione per Gli Affari di Commercio. Naples: Stabilimento Tipografico Domenico Capasso: 7–8. 1848.
- Società di scrittori (1853). Cronaca italiana dal 1814 al 1850. Vol. 2. Florence: Massimo Dini Editore.
- Per la Banca del Tavoliere di Puglia contro Errico Gompertz.
- Nicomede Bianchi (1867). Storia documentata della diplomazia in Italia dall'anno 1814 all'anno 1861. Vol. 3. Turin: Unione Tipografico-Editrice. pp. 315–316.
- Ferdinando Villani (1876). La nuova Arpi - Cenni storici e biografici riguardanti la città di Foggia. Salerno: Premiato Stabilimento Tipografico Migliaccio. pp. 159–160.

== See also ==
- Kingdom of the Two Sicilies
- Luca de Samuele Cagnazzi
