= Conceptual character =

Term in philosophy

Conceptual character or ‘conceptual personae’ is a philosophical term in Continental philosophy, and notably associated with the French philosophers Gilles Deleuze and Félix Guattari. The term denotes fictional, or semi-fictional, characters created by one or more authors to convey one or more ideas. Even if originally a historical individual may have existed, this individual was later instrumentalized by the authors to argue for or from a particular viewpoint. Michel Onfray, in his Contre histoire de la philosophie ("Counter-history of philosophy"), regularly used this concept, like many historians of philosophy, to explain Socrates' position in Plato's Symposium. Onfray argued that, since Socrates never wrote anything down, Plato used the voice of his master in the Symposium to express his own ideas and point of view, and that therefore, when you read the Symposium, you need to keep in mind you are reading the arguments and point of view of Plato, not Socrates.

== Examples ==
- Nietzsche's Zarathustra, Dionysus, and Antichrist.
- Plato's Socrates
- Kierkegaard's Don Juan
- Edmond Rostand's Cyrano de Bergerac

== See also ==
- Historical figure
