= Giuseppe de Samuele Cagnazzi =

Officer of the Kingdom of Naples

- Born: 19 March 1763; Altamura, Kingdom of Naples
- Died: 29 May 1837; Naples, Kingdom of Two Sicilies
- Occupations: politician, teacher

Giuseppe de Samuele Cagnazzi (1763-1837) was an Italian politician of the Kingdom of Naples. He was an inspector and director of the customs department of the Kingdom of Naples. He was the elder brother of Italian scientist and economist Luca de Samuele Cagnazzi.

== Life ==
Giuseppe de Samuele Cagnazzi was born in Altamura on March 19, 1763, to Livia Nesti and Ippolito Cagnazzi. He was the younger brother of Italian scientist and economist Luca de Samuele Cagnazzi and, after the premature loss of their father, their father's friend Carlo de Marco took care of the two siblings, especially their education, in order to ensure them a prestigious careers in politics. They both studied in the first years in the Royal College of Bari Real Collegio and subsequently they completed their studies at the University of Altamura.

During the Altamuran Revolution (1799), Giuseppe Cagnazzi, according to the extensive research carried out by historian Vincenzo Vicenti, joined it and then he left the Altamura in order to escape death. He left his wife and children inside the city and later he managed to return to his hometown. His wife was Elisabetta de Gemmis, daughter of the scholar Ferrante de Gemmis, and he had four children from her; according to the autobiography of his brother Luca de Samuele Cagnazzi, Elisabetta de Gemmis died in 1799 in the aftermath of the Altamuran Revolution. Giuseppe Cagnazzi, therefore, became a widower when he was only 36. Historian Vincenzo Vicenti managed to find a source in which Giuseppe Cagnazzi wrote that she was victim of "the bloody horrors of the brigands", which caused her premature death"

When Joseph Bonaparte ascended the throne of the Kingdom of Naples, he was rehabilitated and received prestigious public positions, first in the customs department and later in the tobacco industry.

In Avellino, Giuseppe Cagnazzi was also asked to teach mathematics to the children of some notable French officers. Among them was Victor Hugo, son of Joseph Léopold Sigisbert Hugo, then governor of that province. Giuseppe Cagnazzi died on May 29, 1837, of "pectoral influx".

He was also known in the field of music as an amateur violin and viola player. Moreover, an instrumental music academy was held in his house twice a week with teachers paid by him. "He Reciped instrumental productions by renowned French and German authors and invited talented teachers, such as Vincenzo Bellini".

== Positions ==
- Ispettore dei dazi indiretti of the Kingdom of Naples (1807–?)
- Direttore dei dazi indiretti of the Kingdom of Naples
- Director of the fabbrica della grande economia dei tabacchi of the Kingdom of Naples
- Victor Hugo's math teacher

== Relatives ==
- Ippolito de Samuele Cagnazzi - father
- Livia Nesti - mother
- Luca de Samuele Cagnazzi (1764–1852) - brother
- Elisabetta de Gemmis (?–1799) - wife
- Ippolito de Samuele Cagnazzi - son (married to Mariantonia Martucci, nicknamed Antonietta)

== Bibliography ==
- Vincenzo Vicenti (1998). Arcangela Vicenti e Giuseppe Pupillo (ed.). Medaglioni altamurani del 1799. Cassano delle Murge: Messaggi. pp. 45–46. Archived from the original on 2021-07-18.
- Luca de Samuele Cagnazzi (1944). Alessandro Cutolo (ed.). La mia vita. Milan: Ulrico Hoepli.
- "Riconoscimento e liquidazione di credito a carico del Comune di Altamura - Ippolito e Luca de Samuele Cagnazzi". Repertorio Sull'amministrazione Civile Nel Regno delle Due Sicilie. 1. Naples: Stabilimento Fu Migliaccio: 572. 1851.

== See also ==
- Luca de Samuele Cagnazzi
- Altamuran Revolution
- Ferrante de Gemmis
- Gioacchino de Gemmis
