= Declamation =

Art of public speaking; Roman genre

Declamation (from the Latin: declamatio) is an artistic form of public speaking. It is a dramatic oration designed to express through articulation, emphasis and gesture the full sense of the text being conveyed.

== History ==
=== Antiquity ===
In Ancient Rome, declamation was a genre of ancient rhetoric and a mainstay of the Roman higher education system. It was separated into two component subgenres, the controversia, speeches of defense or prosecution in fictitious court cases, and the suasoria, in which the speaker advised a historical or legendary figure as to a course of action. Roman declamations survive in four corpora: the compilations of Seneca the Elder and Calpurnius Flaccus, as well as two sets of controversiae, the Major Declamations and Minor Declamations spuriously attributed to Quintilian.

Declamation had its origin in the form of preliminary exercises for Greek students of rhetoric: works from the Greek declamatory tradition survive in works such as the collections of Sopater of Apamea and Choricius of Gaza. Of the remaining Roman declamations the vast majority are controversiae; only one book of suasoriae survive, that being in Seneca the Elder's collection. The controversiae as they currently exist normally consist of several elements: an imaginary law, a theme which introduced a tricky legal situation, and an argument which records a successful or model speech on the topic. It was normal for students to employ illustrative exempla from Roman history and legend (such as were collected in the work of Valerius Maximus) to support their case. Important points were often summed up via pithy epigrammatic statements (sententiae). Common themes include ties of fidelity between fathers and sons, heroes and tyrants in the archaic city, and conflicts between rich and poor men.

As a critical part of rhetorical education, declamation's influence was widespread in Roman elite culture. In addition to its didactic role, it is also attested as a performative genre: public declamations were visited by such figures as Pliny the Elder, Asinius Pollio, Maecenas, and the emperor Augustus. The poet Ovid is recorded by Seneca the Elder as being a star declaimer, and the works of the satirists Martial and Juvenal, as well as the historian Tacitus, reveal a substantial declamatory influence.

Later examples of declamation can be seen in the work of the sixth century AD bishop and author Ennodius.

=== Classic revival ===
In the eighteenth century, a classical revival of the art of public speaking, often referred to as The Elocution Movement occurred in Britain. While elocution focused on the voice—articulation, diction, and pronunciation—declamation focused on delivery. Rather than a narrow focus on rhetoric, or persuasion, practitioners involved in the movement focused on improving speech and gesture to convey the full sentiment of the message. Traditionally, practitioners of declamation served in the clergy, legislature or law, but by the nineteenth century, the practice had extended to theatrical and reformist venues. Initially, the aim was to improve the standard of oral communication, as high rates of illiteracy made it imperative for churches, courts and parliaments, to rely on the spoken word. Through modification of inflection and phrasing, along with appropriate gestures, speakers were taught to convey the meaning and persuade the audience, rather than deliver monotonous litanies.

In 1841, Italian scientist Luca de Samuele Cagnazzi introduced the tonograph, a device invented by him and capable of measuring the inflections and tones of human voice. It was meant to be employed inside declamation schools and it provided a way to record some characteristics of human voice, in order to provide the posterity with enough information on how declamation was carried out at that time. In the eighteenth century, the Académie des inscriptions et belles-lettres of Paris had unsuccessfully tried to distinguish between smaller fractions of the diatonic and harmonic scales. His perpetual secretary Charles Pinot Duclos wrote that Jean-Baptiste Dubos had proposed to hire a team of experts in the field of music, in order to carry out that task, but they didn't succeed (since no device was used and humans cannot distinguish between smaller fractions of scales without a proper device).

By the mid-nineteenth century, reformers were using the "art of declamation" to publicly address vice and provide moral guidance. In the Americas, missionary-run schools focused on teaching former slaves the art of public speaking to enable them to elevate others of their race as teachers and ministers. Using drama as a tool to teach, reformers hoped to standardize the spoken word, while creating a sense of national pride. Studies and presentation of declamation flourished in Latin America and particularly in the African-American and Afro-Caribbean communities through the first third of the twentieth century. Practitioners attempted to interpret their orations to convey the emotions and feeling behind the writer's words to the audience, rather than simply recite them. In the twentieth century, among black practitioners, topical focus often was on the irony of their lives in a post-slavery world, recognizing that they had gained freedom but were limited by racial discrimination. Presentation involved use of African rhythms from dance and music, and local dialect, as a form of social protest.

== See also ==
- Eloquence
- Persuasion
- Spoken word

== Bibliography ==
- Bell, Andrew, ed. (1810). Encyclopaedia Britannica, Or a Dictionary of Arts, Sciences, and Miscellaneous Literature. Vol. 7. Edinburgh, Scotland: Archibald Constable and Company.
- de Samuele Cagnazzi, Luca (1841). La tonografia escogitata da Luca de Samuele Cagnazzi. Naples: Stamperia della Società Filomatica.
- Goring, Paul (2014). "The Elocutionary Movement in Britain". In MacDonald, Michael J. (ed.). The Oxford Handbook of Rhetorical Studies. Vol. 1. Oxford, England: Oxford University Press. pp. 558–568. doi:10.1093/oxfordhb/9780199731596.013.043. ISBN 978-0-199-73159-6. – via Oxford University Press's Reference Online (subscription required)
- Harrington, Dana (Winter 2010). "Remembering the Body: Eighteenth-Century Elocution and the Oral Tradition". Rhetorica. 28 (1). Berkeley, California: University of California Press for the International Society for the History of Rhetoric: 67–95. doi:10.1525/rh.2010.28.1.67. ISSN 0734-8584. JSTOR 10.1525/rh.2010.28.1.67. S2CID 144045330.
- Kuhnheim, Jill S. (2008). "Performing Poetry, Race, and the Caribbean: Eusebia Cosme and Luis Palés Matos". Revista Hispánica Moderna. 61 (2). Philadelphia, Pennsylvania: University of Pennsylvania Press: 135–147. ISSN 0034-9593. Archived from the original on 17 July 2018.
- Miller, Henry D. (2010). Theorizing Black Theatre: Art Versus Protest in Critical Writings, 1898–1965. Jefferson, North Carolina: McFarland & Company. ISBN 978-0-7864-6014-4.
- Sussmann, Lewis A., ed. (1994). The Declamations of Calpurnius Flaccus: Text, Translation, and Commentary. Mnemosyne Bibliotheca Classica Batava. Vol. 133. Leiden: Brill. ISBN 9789004099838.
- "La poesía negra" [Black poetry] (in Spanish). Asunción, Paraguay: ABC Color. 2 June 2006. Archived from the original on 4 December 2017.
