= Historical figure =

Famous person in history

A historical figure is a significant person in history, who may have made important cultural, social, political, scientific or technological impacts on humanity. They are often widely known for their achievements, whether favourably or unfavourably.

The significance of such figures in human progress has been debated. Some think they play a crucial role, while others say they have little impact on the broad currents of thought and social change. The concept is generally used in the sense that the person really existed in the past, as opposed to being legendary. However, the legends that can grow up around historical figures may be hard to distinguish from fact. Sources are often incomplete and may be inaccurate, particularly those from early periods of history. Without a body of personal documents, the more subtle aspects of personality of a historical figure can only be deduced. With historical figures who were also religious figures attempts to separate fact from belief may be controversial.

== Significance ==
The significance of historical figures has long been the subject of debate by philosophers. Hegel (1770–1831) considered that "world-historical figures" played a pivotal role in human progress, but felt that they were bound to emerge when change was needed. Thomas Carlyle (1795–1881) saw the study of figures such as Muhammad, William Shakespeare and Oliver Cromwell as key to understanding history. Herbert Spencer (1820–1903), an early believer in evolution and in the universality of natural law, felt that historical individuals were of little importance.

=== Hegel's world-historical figure ===
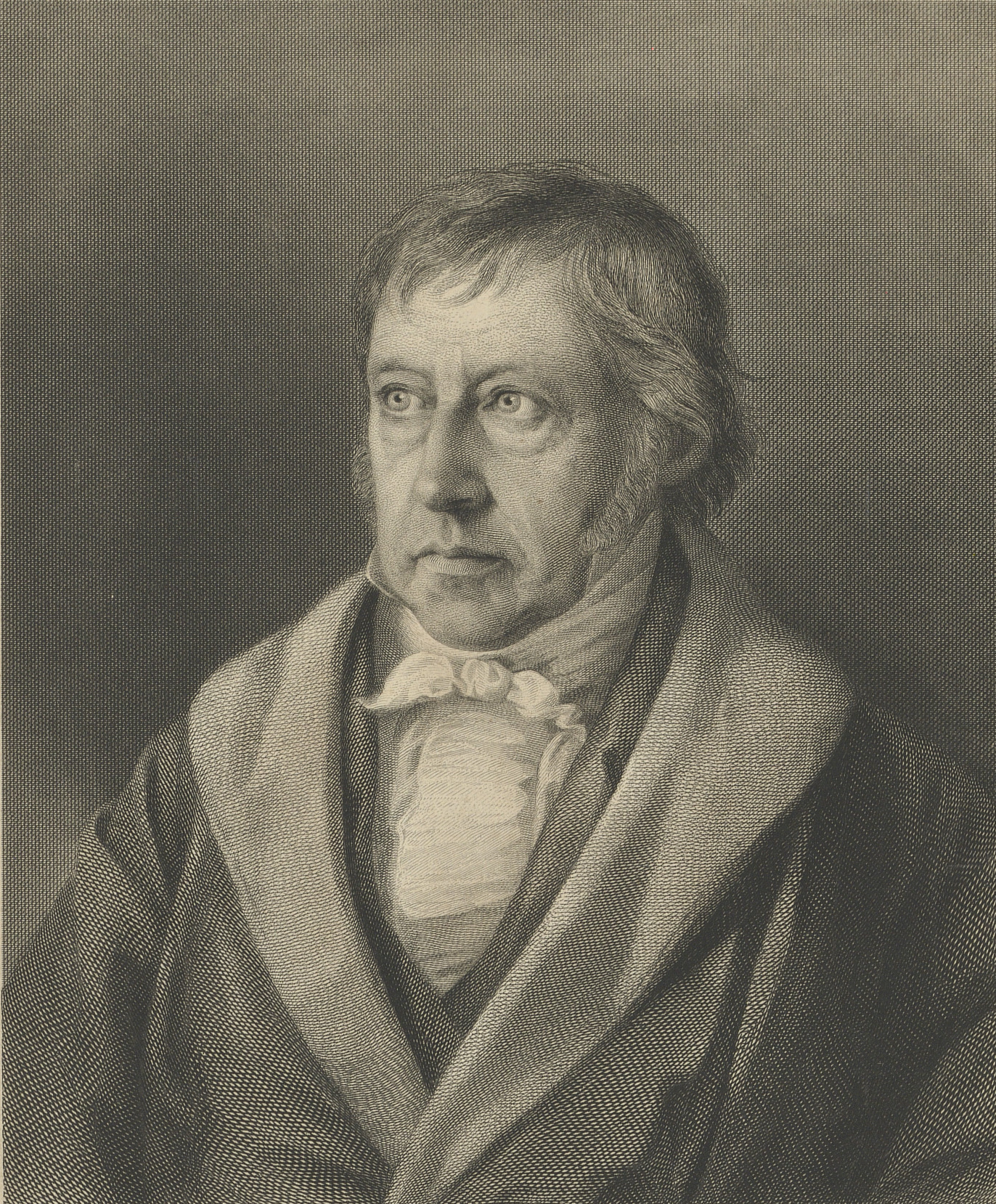
Georg Wilhelm Friedrich Hegel introduced the concept of the "world-historical figure".

The German philosopher Hegel defined the concept of the world-historical figure, who embodied the ruthless advance of Immanuel Kant's World Spirit, often overthrowing outdated structures and ideas. To him, Napoleon was such a figure. Hegel proposed that a world-historical figure essentially posed a challenge, or thesis, and this would generate an antithesis, or opposing force. Eventually a synthesis would resolve the conflict. Hegel viewed Julius Caesar as a world historical figure, who appeared at a stage when Rome had grown to the point it could no longer continue as a republican city state but had to become an empire. Caesar failed in his bid to make himself an emperor, and was assassinated, but the empire came into existence soon afterward, and Caesar's name has become synonymous with "emperor" in forms such as "kaiser" or "czar".

Søren Kierkegaard, in his early essay The Concept of Irony, generally agrees with Hegel's views, such as his characterization of Socrates as a world-historical figure who acted as a destructive force on Greek received views of morality. In Hegel's view, Socrates broke down social harmony by questioning the meaning of concepts like "justice" and "virtue". Eventually, the Athenians condemned Socrates to death. But they could not stop the evolution of thought that Socrates had begun, which would lead to the concept of individual conscience. Hegel said of world-historical figures,

It was theirs to know this nascent principle; the necessary, directly sequent step in progress, which their world was to take; to make this their aim, and to expend their energy in promoting it ... They died early like Alexander; they were murdered, like Caesar; transported to St. Helena, like Napoleon ... They are great men, because they willed and accomplished something great; not a mere fancy, a mere intention, but that which met the case and fell in with the needs of the age.

However, Hegel, Thomas Carlyle and others noted that the great historical figures were just representative men, expressions of the material forces of history. Essentially they have little choice about what they do. This is in conflict with the views of George Bancroft or Ralph Waldo Emerson, who praised self-reliance and individualism, and in conflict with Karl Marx and Friedrich Engels, who also felt that individuals can determine their destiny. Engels found that Hegel's system contained an "internal and incurable contradiction", resting as it does on both dialectical relativism and idealistic absolutism.

=== Spencerian view ===
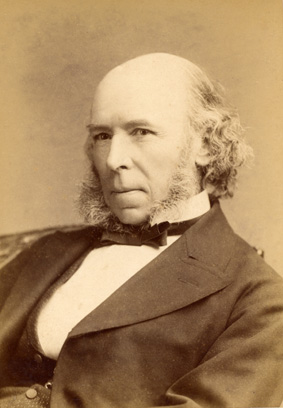
Herbert Spencer, who considered events in the lives of kings "historic trivalities"

The English philosopher and evolutionist Herbert Spencer, who was highly influential in the latter half of the nineteenth century, felt that historical figures were relatively unimportant. He wrote to a friend, "I ignore utterly the personal element in history, and, indeed, show little respect for history altogether as it is ordinarily conceived." He wrote, "The births, deaths, and marriages of kings, and other like historic trivialities, are committed to memory, not because of any direct benefits that can possibly result from knowing them: but because society considers them parts of a good education." In his essay What Knowledge Is of Most Worth? he wrote:

That which constitutes History, properly so called, is in great part omitted from works on the subject. Only of late years have historians commenced giving us, in any considerable quantity, the truly valuable information. As in past ages the king was everything and the people nothing; So, in past histories, the doings of the king fill the entire picture, to which the national life forms but an obscure background. While only now, when the welfare of nations rather than of rulers is becoming the dominant idea, are historians beginning to occupy themselves with the phenomena of social progress. The thing it really concerns us to know is the natural history of society.

=== Inevitability or determinism ===
Taken to an extreme, one may consider that what Hegel calls the "world spirit" and T. S. Eliot calls "those vast impersonal forces" hold us in their grip. What happens is predetermined. Both Hegel and Marx advocated historical inevitability in contrast to the doctrine of contingency, allowing for alternative outcomes, that was advocated by Friedrich Nietzsche, Michel Foucault and others. However, Marx argued against the use of the "historical inevitability" argument when used to explain the destruction of early communes in Russia. As an orthodox Marxist, Vladimir Lenin believed in the ideas of history that Marx had developed, including the historical inevitability of capitalism followed by a transition to socialism. Despite this, Lenin also believed the transition could be effected faster by voluntary action.

In 1936 Karl Popper published an influential paper on The Poverty of Historicism, published as a book in 1957, that attacked the doctrine of historical inevitability. The historian Isaiah Berlin, author of Historical Inevitability, also argued forcibly against this view, going as far as to say that some choices are entirely free and cannot be predicted scientifically. Berlin presented his views in a 1953 lecture at the London School of Economics, published soon afterwards. When speaking he referred to Ludwig Wittgenstein's views, but the published version speaks approvingly of Karl Popper, which caused a stir among academics.

=== Heroic view ===
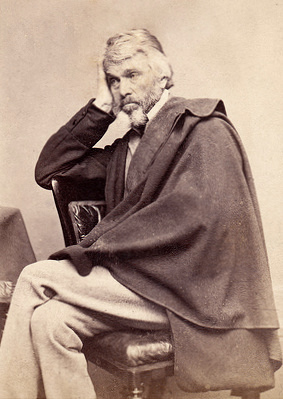
Thomas Carlyle, champion of study of great men

Thomas Carlyle has espoused the "heroic view" of history, famously saying in his essay on the Norse god Odin in his book On heroes, hero-worship, & the heroic in history that "No great man lives in vain. The History of the world is but the Biography of great men ... We do not now call our great men Gods, nor admire without limit; ah no, with limit enough! But if we have no great men, or do not admire at all,— that were a still worse case." Carlyle's historical philosophy was based on the "Great Man theory", saying, "Universal History, the history of what man has accomplished in the world ... [is] at bottom the History of the Great Men who have worked here." An extreme believer in individuality, he also believed that the masses of people should let themselves be guided by the great leaders of men. Talking of poets he said,

That ideal outline of himself, which a man unconsciously shadows forth in his writings, and which, if rightly deciphered, will be truer than any other representation of him, it is the task of the Biographer to fill-up into an actual coherent figure, and to bring him to our experience, or at least our clear undoubted admiration, thereby to instruct and edify us in many ways. Conducted on such principles, the Biography of great men, especially of great Poets, that is, of men in the highest degree noble-minded and wise, might become one of the most dignified and valuable species of composition.

More recently, in his 1943 book The Hero in History, the pragmatist scholar Sidney Hook asserts:

That history is made by men and women is no longer denied except by some theologians and mystical metaphysicians. And even they are compelled indirectly to acknowledge this commonplace truth, for they speak of historical personages as 'instruments' of Providence, Justice, Reason, Dialectic, the Zeitgeist, or Spirit of the Times. Men agree more readily about the consequences of the use of 'instruments' in history than they do about the ultimate ends 'instruments' allegedly serve, or the first causes by which they are allegedly determined.

Hook recognizes the relevance of the environment within which the "great man" or "hero" acted, but asserts that this can provide the backdrop but never the plot of the "dramas of human history". and distinguish life and species

=== Ranking ===
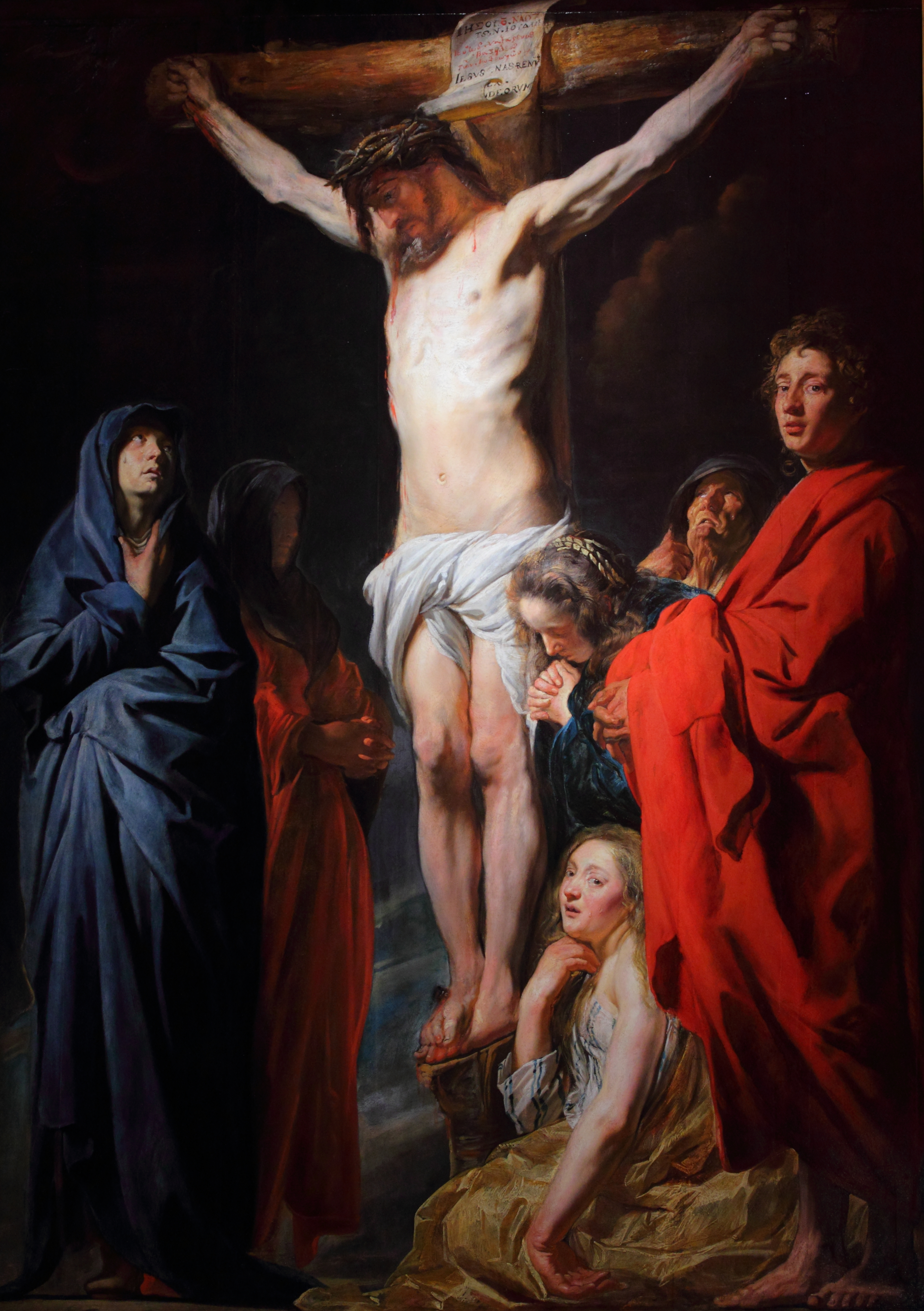
The crucifixion of Jesus, the central figure of Christianity, painted by Jacob Jordaens in the 17th century.

There have been rankings of the significance of major historical figures. For example, Cesar A. Hidalgo and colleagues at the MIT Media Lab has calculated the memorability of historical figures using data such as the number of language editions for which there are articles for each person, the pageviews received, and other factors. These lists are available at MIT's Pantheon project.

== Historical truth ==
It is sometimes hard to discern whether apparently historical figures from the earliest periods did in fact exist, due to the lack of records. Even with more recent personages, stories or anecdotes about the person often accumulate that have no basis in fact. Although the external aspects of a historical figure may be well documented, their inner nature can only be a subject of speculation. It can also not be only a subject of speculation as many historical figures such as Hitler explicitly articulated their thoughts and intentions. With religious figures, often the subjects of voluminous literature, separating "fact" from "belief" can be difficult if not impossible.

=== Ancient figures ===
With older texts it can be difficult to be sure whether a person in the text is, in fact, a historical figure. "Wisdom literature" from early middle-eastern cultures (such as the Book of Job), mainly consist of verbal expositions or discussions that must be considered the work of the author, rather than the character supposedly speaking. It may still be possible to identify a figure in such texts with a historical figure known from some other context, and the text may be taken as informative about this figure, even if not verified by an independent source. On the other hand, a text may include realistic settings and references to historical people, while the central character may or may not be a historical figure.

=== Fables ===
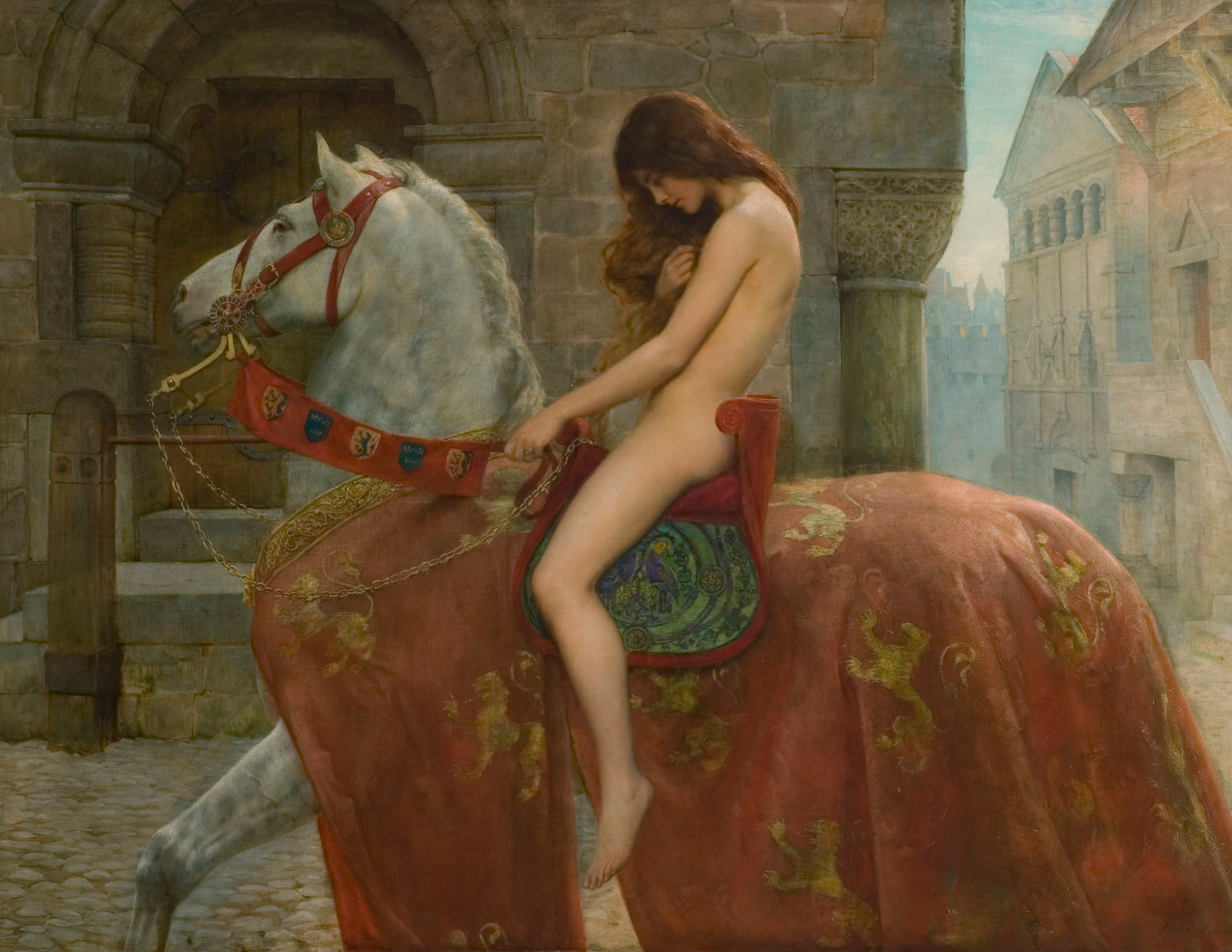
Lady Godiva was a historical figure, but there is no evidence that the legend of her riding naked through the streets is true (Lady Godiva painting, 1897 by John Collier)

Napoleon spoke of history as being a fable which had been agreed upon:– "la fable convenue qu'on appellera l'histoire". Great figures of the past have stories told about them which grow in the telling, and so become myths and legends which may dominate or displace the more prosaic historical facts about them. For example, some ancient chroniclers said that the Emperor Nero fiddled while Rome burned, but Tacitus disputed this by saying the stories were just malicious rumours. Similarly, there is no good evidence that Marie Antoinette ever said "let them eat cake", or that Lady Godiva rode naked through the streets of Coventry.

=== Personality ===
Thomas Carlyle pointed out that even to the person living it, every life "remains in so many points unintelligible". The historian must struggle when writing biographies, "the very facts of which, to say nothing of the purport of them, we know not, and cannot know!" Some psychologists have sought to understand the personalities of historical figures through clues about the way in which they were raised. However, this theoretical psychoanalytic approach is not supported empirically. An alternative approach, favored by psychobiographers such as William Runyan, is to explain the personality of the historical figure in terms of their life history. This approach has the advantage of recognizing that personality may evolve over time in response to events.

=== Religious figures ===
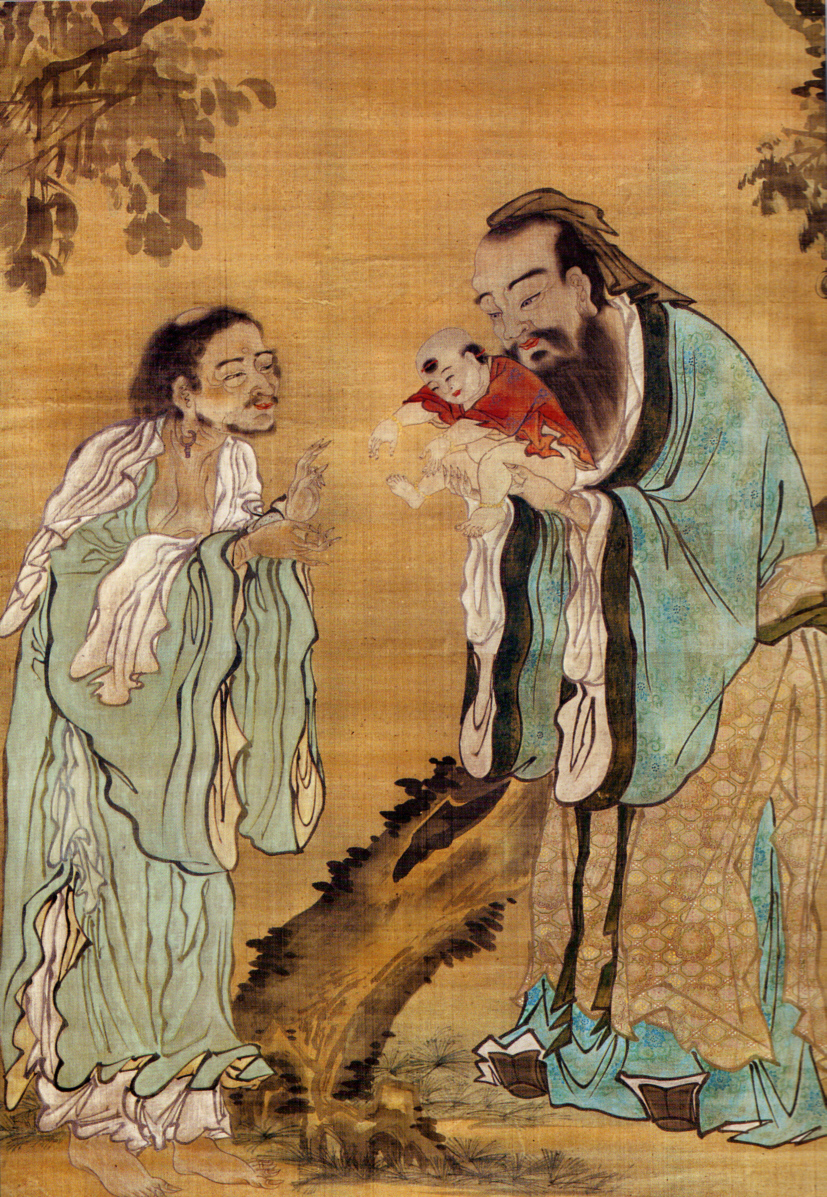
Three great historical figures — Confucius presenting the Buddha to Lao Tsu. They are all of such antiquity that the historical facts about them are now overlaid with centuries of myth and legend.

With historical religious figures, fact and belief may be difficult to disentangle. There are cultural differences in the treatment of historical figures. Thus the Chinese can recognise that Mencius or Confucius were historical individuals, while also endowing them with sanctity. In Hinduism, on the other hand, figures such as Krishna or Rama are seen by the followers as embodiments of gods. The Nirvana Sutra states: "Do not rely on the man but on the Dharma." A teacher such as Gautama Buddha is thus treated almost exclusively as a lesser god rather than a historical figure.

E. P. Sanders, author of The Historical Figure of Jesus, called Jesus of Nazareth "one of the most important figures in human history". Various writers have struggled to present "historical" views of Jesus, as opposed to views distorted by belief. When writing about this subject, a historian who relies only on sources other than the New Testament may be criticized for implying that it is not a sufficient source of information about the subject.

The theologian Martin Kähler is known for his work Der sogenannte historische Jesus und der geschichtliche, biblische Christus (The so-called historical Jesus, and the historic, biblical Christ). He clearly distinguished between "the Jesus of history" and "the Christ of faith". Some historians openly admit bias, which may anyway be unavoidable. Paul Hollenback says he writes about the historical Jesus, "...in order to overthrow, not simply correct, the mistake called Christianity." Another historian who has written about Jesus, Frederick Gaiser, says, "historical investigation is part and parcel of biblical faith."

== Political appropriation ==
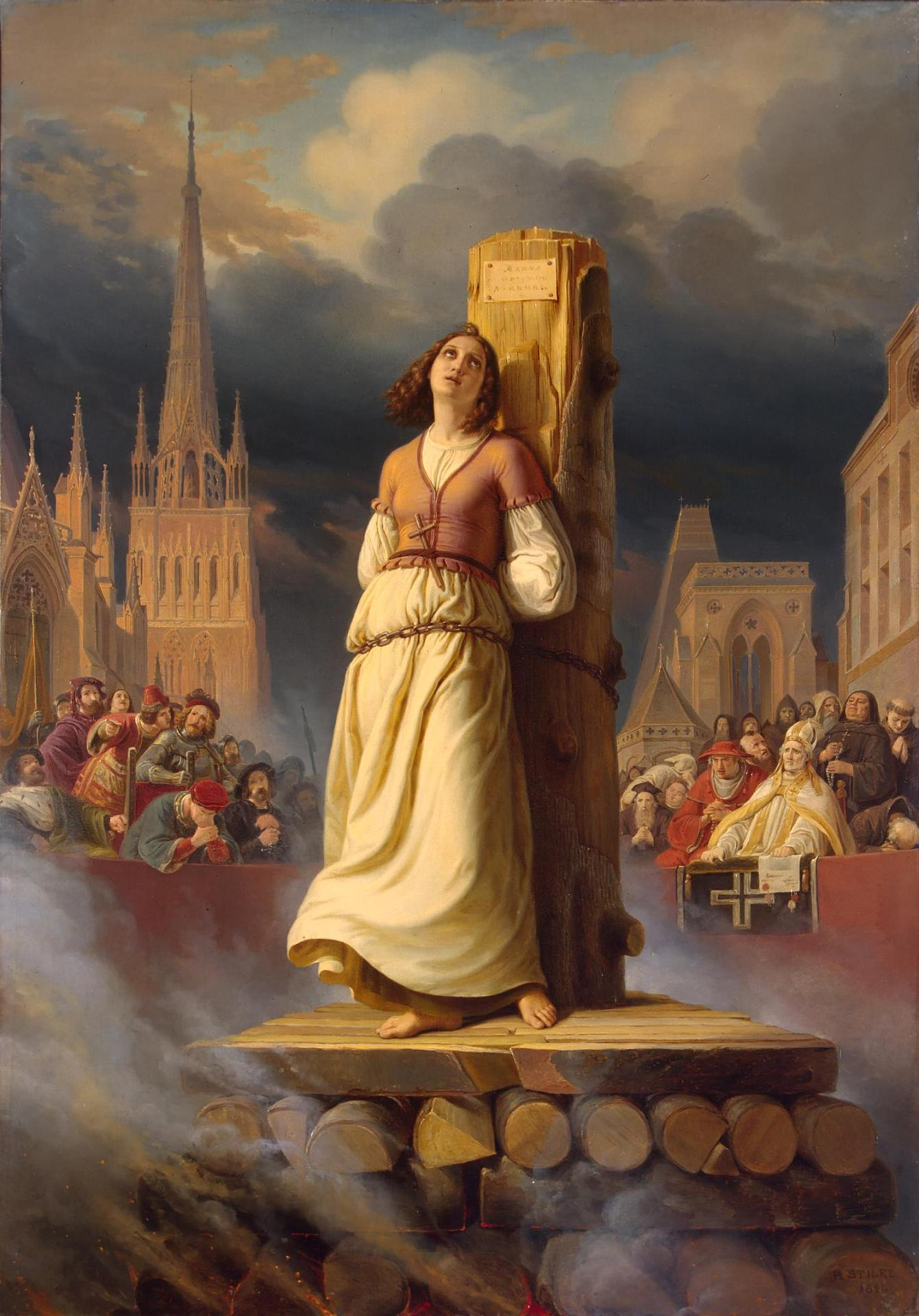
An 1843 view of a heroic Joan of Arc at the stake.

A historical figure may be interpreted to support political aims. In France in the first half of the seventeenth century, there was an outpouring of writing about Joan of Arc, including seven biographies, three plays and an epic poem. Joan had become a symbol of national pride and the Catholic faith, helping unite a country that had been divided by the recent wars of religion. The reality of the historical Joan was subordinated to the need for a symbol of feminine strength, Christian virtue and resistance to the English. George Bernard Shaw, introducing his 1923 play Saint Joan, discussed representations of Joan by other authors. He felt that William Shakespeare's depiction in Henry VI, Part 1 was constrained from making her a "beautiful and romantic figure" by political considerations. Voltaire's version in his poem La Pucelle d'Orléans was also flawed by Voltaire's biases and Friedrich Schiller's play Die Jungfrau von Orleans "is not about Joan at all, and can hardly be said to pretend to be."

A historical figure may be used to validate a politician's claim to authority, where the modern leader shapes and exploits the ideas associated with the historical figure, which they are presumed to have inherited. Thus, Jesse Jackson has frequently evoked the spirit of Martin Luther King Jr. Fidel Castro often presented himself as following the path defined by José Martí. Hugo Chávez of Venezuela frequently identified himself with the historical figure Simón Bolívar, the liberator of South America from Spanish rule.

Georg Hegel believed in the role of the state in guaranteeing individual liberties, and his views were therefore rejected by the German Nazi Party, who considered him dangerously liberal and perhaps a proto-Marxist. On the other hand, Adolf Hitler identified himself as a Hegelian world historical figure, and justified his actions on this basis.

== In education ==
In education, presenting information as if it were being told by a historical figure may give it greater impact. Since classical times, students have been asked to put themselves in the place of a historical figure as a way of bringing history to life. Historical figures are often represented in fiction, where fact and fancy are combined. In earlier traditions, before the rise of a critical historical tradition, authors took less care to be as accurate when describing what they knew of historical figures and their actions, interpolating imaginary elements intended to serve a moral purpose to events.

Plato used historical figures in his writing, but only to illustrate his points. Xenophon used Cyrus the Great in the same way. When Plato apparently quotes Socrates in The Republic, it is only to add dramatic effect to the presentation of his own thought. For this reason, Plato's writings on Socrates tell us little, at least directly, about Socrates. The historical figure is used only as a device for communicating Plato's ideas. In classical Rome, students of rhetoric had to master the suasoria — a form of declamation in which they wrote the soliloquy of a historical figure who was debating a critical course of action. For example, the poet Juvenal wrote a speech for the dictator Sulla, in which he was counselled to retire. The poet Ovid enjoyed this exercise more than the other final challenge — the controversia.

The German philosopher Friedrich Nietzsche wrote an influential essay "On the Uses and Disadvantages of History for Life". He said "the unhistorical and historical are necessary in equal measure for the health of an individual, of a people and of a culture." Nietzsche identifies three approaches to history, each with dangers. The monumental approach describes the glories of the past, often focusing on heroic figures like Elizabeth I of England, King Robert the Bruce or Louis Pasteur. By treating these figures as models, the student is tempted to consider that there can be nobody of such stature today. The antiquarian view examines the past in minute and reverent detail, turning its back on the present. The critical approach challenges traditional views, even though they may be valid.

Historical figures may today be simulated as animated pedagogical agents to teach history and foreign culture. An example is Freudbot, which acted the part of Sigmund Freud for psychology students. When a variety of simulated character types were tried as educational agents, students rated historical figures as the most engaging. There are gender differences in the perception of historical figures. When modern US schoolchildren were asked to roleplay or illustrate historical stereotypes, boys tended to focus upon male figures exclusively while girls showed more varied family groupings.

== In branding ==
Using historical figures in marketing communications and in branding is a new area of marketing research but historical figures’ names were used to promote products as early as in the Middle Ages.

Historical figure brand is using famous historical person in branding, for instance Mozartkugel, Chopin (vodka) or Café Einstein.

Historical figure is a person who lived in the past and whose deeds exerted a significant impact on other people’s lives and consciousness. These figures are attributed with certain features that are a compilation of the actual values they proclaimed and the manner they were perceived by others. This perception evolves and subsequent generations read the biography of a given historical figure in their own way through their own knowledge and experience. In order to determine the popularity of the commercialisation of historical figures, a study was conducted at the beginning of 2014 on the number of trademark protection applications filed with the Patent Office of the Republic of Poland as a measure of entrepreneurs’ interest in this activity. The names of 300 most prominent Polish historical figures were considered. The study showed that over 21% of the names analysed were recorded in the trademark register. 1,033 trademark protection applications were filed for 64 names out of the 300 historical figures investigated [Aldona Lipka, 2015,]. The greatest number of trademark protection applications were recorded for Mieszko (295), followed by Nicolaus Copernicus (250), John III Sobieski (94) and Chopin (81).

== In art and literature ==
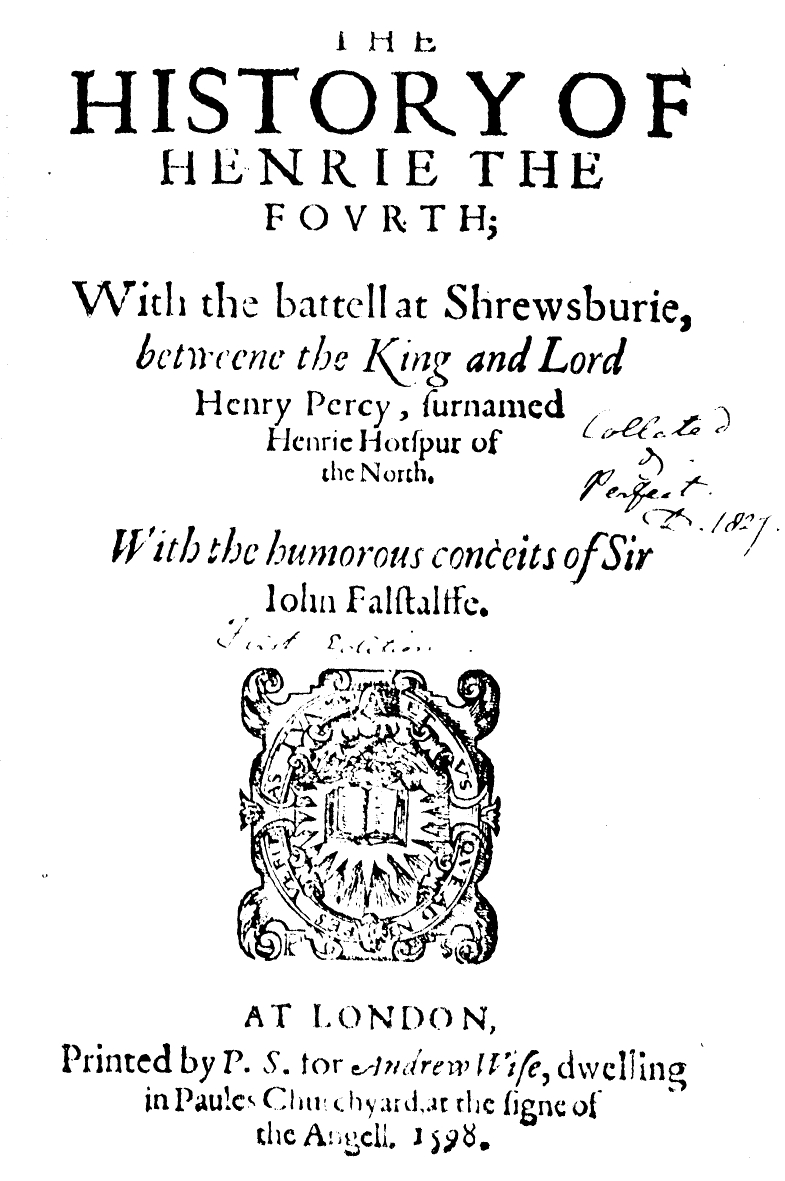
William Shakespeare wrote a number of plays that dramatized the lives of historical figures, but introduced fictional characters such as Sir John Falstaff.

=== Realist historical fiction ===
There is a huge body of historical fiction, where the text includes both imaginary and factual elements. In early English literature, Robin Hood was a fictional character, but the historical King Richard I of England also appears. William Shakespeare (Note: William Shakespeare was a historical figure, but as a biographer said, "Such materials as there are for Shakespeare's personal history, or for the history of anyone connected with him, have been gathered with the most loving and persevering industry. Unhappily, they amount to very little. Entries in municipal records, names in a will, a lease, or an inventory, tell hardly anything of the life or character of the man. That orange has now been squeezed dry.") wrote plays about people who were historical figures in his day, such as Julius Caesar. He did not present these people as pure history, but dramatised their lives as a commentary about the people and politics of his own time. Napoleon figured in Victor Hugo's 1862 classic Les Misérables. There are many more examples.

The compiler of a survey of historical novels in the 1920s claimed that the "appearance of reality ... is the great charm of the historical novel." He went on to assert, regarding novels about periods of which little is known, that "the danger is that the very elements which add to our interest in the tale as such will go far to mislead us in our conception of the period dealt with". Traditionally the treatment of historical figures in fiction was realistic in style and respectful of fact. A historical novel would be true to the facts known about the period in which the novel is set, a biographical novel would follow the facts that are known about the protagonist's life, and a "roman à clef" would try to give an accurate interpretation of what is known about a public figure's private life. In each genre, the novelist would avoid introducing any elements that were clearly in conflict with the facts.

A writer may be handicapped by his readers' preconceptions about a historical person, which may or may not be accurate, and the facts about the historical person may also conflict with the novelist's plot requirements. According to the Marxist philosopher György Lukács in his 1937 book on The Historical Novel, "The 'world-historical individual' can only figure as a minor character in the [historical] novel because of the complexity and intricacy of the whole social-historical process." As Jacobs observes, the "realist aesthetic" of the historical novel "assumes that a recognizable historical figure in fiction must not 'do things' its model did not do in real life; it follows that historical figures can be used only in very limited ways." The author of a traditional historical novel should therefore focus more on the people who have been lost to history. A novelist such as Sir Walter Scott or Leo Tolstoy (War and Peace) would describe historical events accurately. They would give rein to their imagination only in scenes that were not significant historically, when interactions with fictional characters could safely be introduced.

=== Modern fiction ===
More recently, however, starting with works such as The Confessions of Nat Turner, and Sophie's Choice by William Styron, the novelist has felt more free to introduce much larger amounts of purely imaginary detail about historical people. E. L. Doctorow illustrates this different attitude when discussing his book Ragtime: "Certain details were so delicious that I was scrupulous about getting them right. Others ... demanded to be mythologized." This reflects a changing attitude about the distinction between "fact" and "truth", expressed by Ursule Molinaro when he makes his Cassandra say, "I've come as close to the truth as facts would let me ... facts oppress the truth, which can breathe freely only in poetry & art."

=== Other media ===
Many films have depicted historical figures. Often the way in which the films interpret these figures and their times reflects the social and cultural values of the period in which the film was made. Historical figures are familiar to the general reader and so may be used in speculative fiction so that readers marvel at their appearance in novel settings or with a fresh perspective. For example, the time traveler The Doctor has encountered numerous historical figures such as Marco Polo and Queen Elizabeth I in his adventures. They appeared most frequently when the television series first started, as it was directed at children and the use of historical figures in historical settings was intended to be educational.

== See also ==
- Celebrity (the modern-day equivalent)
- Persons of National Historic Significance (Canada)
