= Carlucci =

Carlucci is an Italian surname. Notable people with the surname include:

- Cece Carlucci (1917–2008), American baseball umpire
- Dave Carlucci (born 1963), American baseball player and coach
- David Carlucci (born 1981), American politician
- Frank Carlucci (1930–2018), American politician
- Frank Carlucci (Florida politician), American politician
- Gabriella Carlucci (born 1959), Italian television presenter and politician
- Giuseppe Carlucci (1710 ca.–1790 ca.), Italian professor and astronomer
- John Carlucci, American musician
- Milly Carlucci (born 1954), Italian television presenter, actress and singer
- William Carlucci (born 1967), American rower
- Joe Carlucci, American politician

== See also ==
- Aída Kemelmajer de Carlucci (born 1945), Argentine jurist, lawyer, and author
- Carluccio (name)
