= Luca de Samuele Cagnazzi =

Italian politician, economist and presbyter (1764–1852)

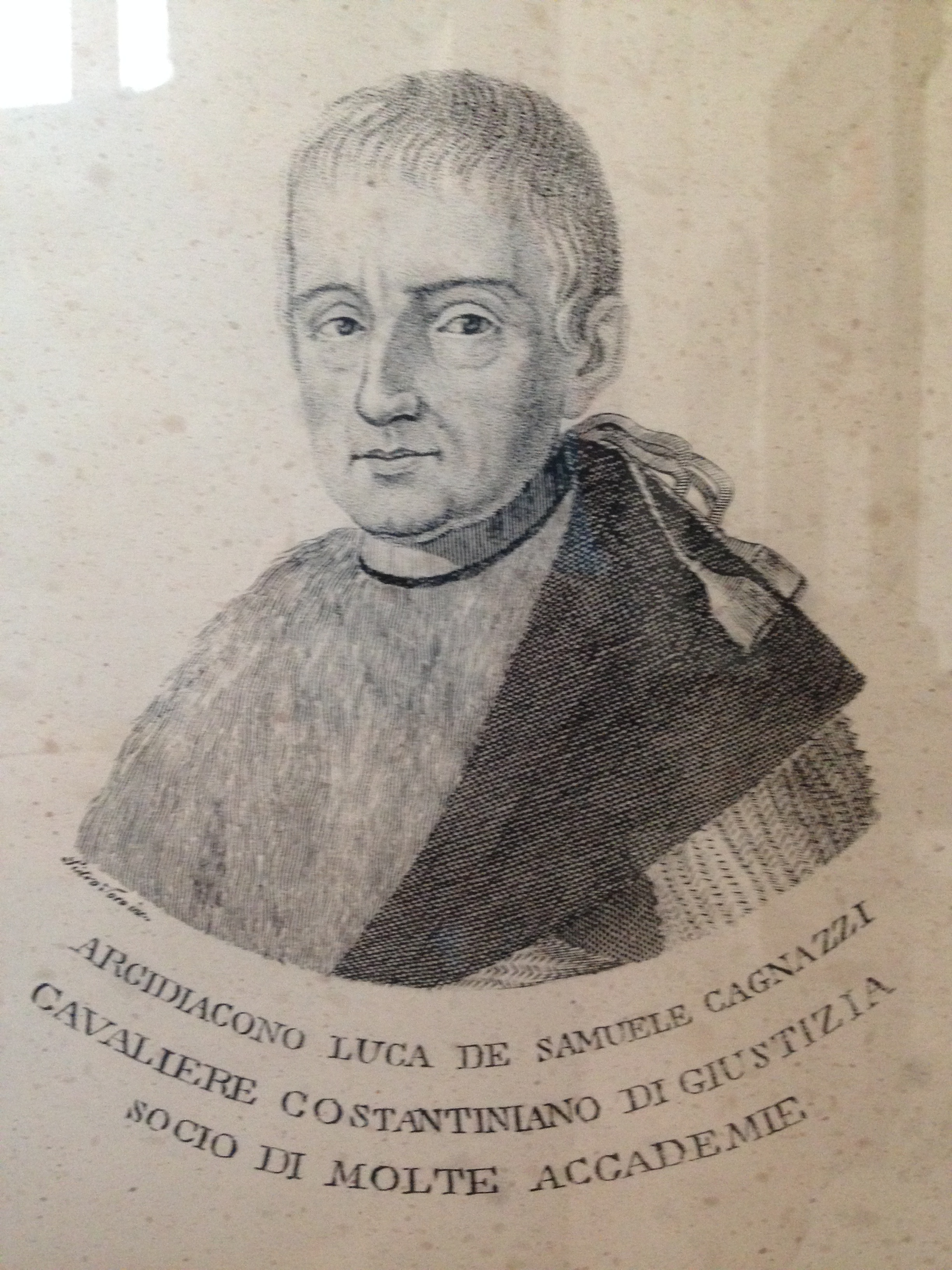
- Archdeacon Luca de Samuele Cagnazzi – picture taken from library A.B.M.C. (Altamura)
- Born: 28 October 1764; Altamura, Kingdom of Naples
- Died: 26 September 1852; Naples, Kingdom of Two Sicilies
- Occupations: professor, archdeacon, deputy

Luca de Samuele Cagnazzi (28 October 1764 – 26 September 1852) was an Italian archdeacon, scientist, mathematician, and political economist. He also wrote a book about pedagogy and invented the tonograph.

== Life ==
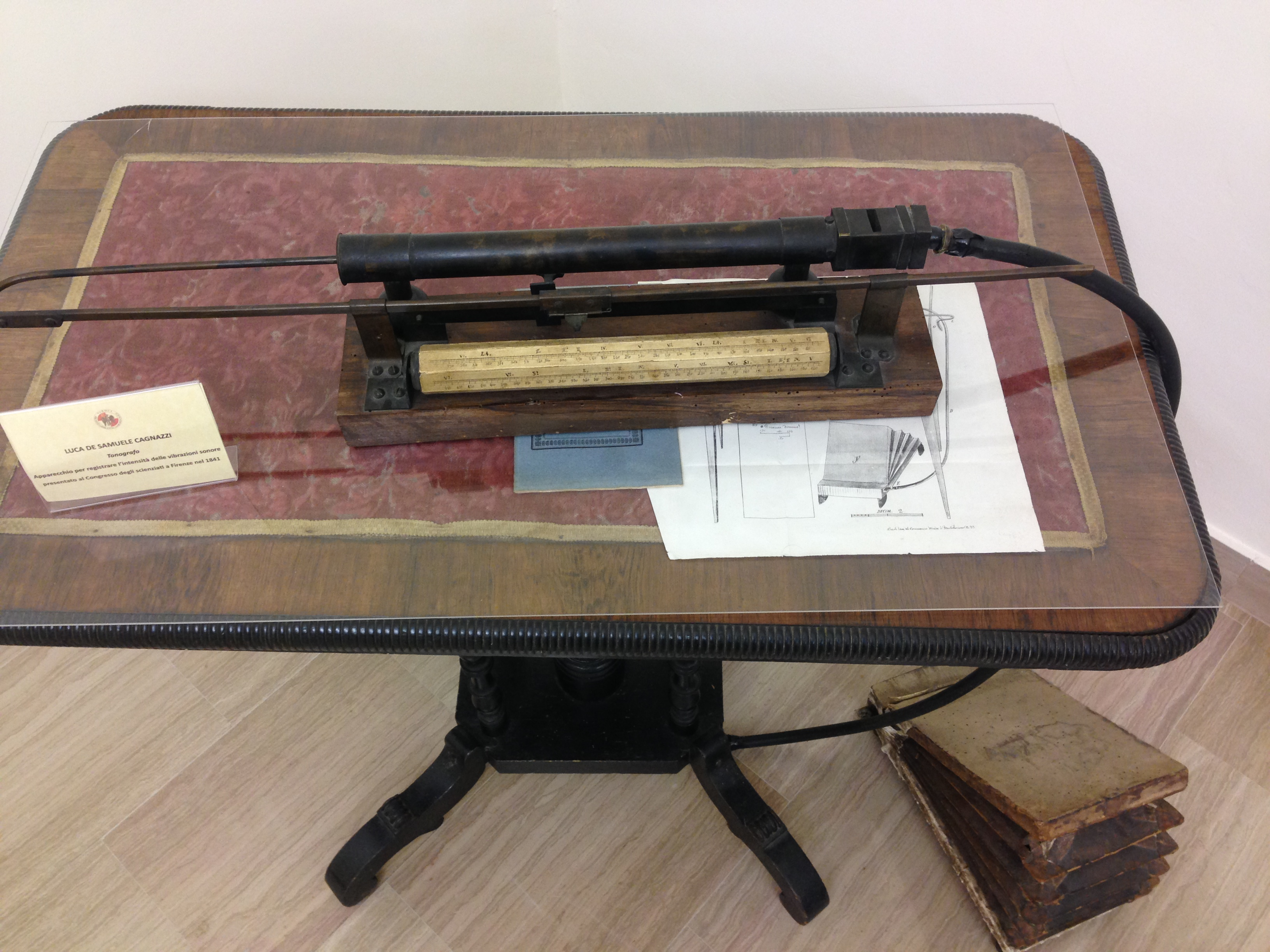
Tonograph invented by Cagnazzi.

=== Early life and education ===
Luca de Samuele Cagnazzi was born in Altamura on 28 October 1764 to parents Ippolito de Samuele Cagnazzi and Livia Nesti. After the death of his father in 1767, he and his elder brother Giuseppe were taken in by family friend Carlo de Marco, who paid for their education.

On 4 June 1772, Cagnazzi and his brother enrolled at the Collegio di Bari, where they had as teachers, among others, Emanuele Mola, Filippo Farchi, and Nicola Fiorentini. Since complex math subjects such as calculus were ignored by scholars in the Kingdom of Naples at the time, Cagnazzi was only educated in basic math, Euclidean geometry, logic and history ("chronology") at the Collegio di Bari. He studied further math subjects on his own time from books, such as the Compiendio d'analisi by Girolamo Saladini. To aid with his difficulties with equations of third degree and higher, he contacted Saladini for advice. Saladini suggested further reading from his book Institutiones Analyticae, written together with Vincenzo Riccati. Cagnazzi left the Collegio di Bari in October 1779, continuing his studies at the University of Altamura. There, he completed his math education under professor Giuseppe Carlucci, along with law education under professor Domenico Castelli.

Subsequently, Cagnazzi moved to Naples, where he continued his studies and was initiated into an ecclesiastical career. His teachers were Canon Ignarra, Marino Guarani and Francesco Conforti. In Naples, Cagnazzi realized that he was particularly skilled in mathematics compared to his peers, and his skills were as deep as the best mathematicians in Naples. As he himself stated, "the only one who cast a shadow on me was Annibale Giordani.". In Naples, Cagnazzi could study math and science and he could exchange views and opinions with the most notable Neapolitan scholars, but he also reluctantly had to study law and theology as his guardian Carlo de Marco wished; this sort of conflict between favorite subjects and hated and reluctantly imposed subjects appears several times in his autobiography. From this, we learn how this situation was very common at his time; some acquaintances of him had even developed a kind of disease derived from the imposition of subjects not congenial with their vocation. As early as his youth, Cagnazzi started to develop health problems; they were of various kinds (backache, fever etc.) and are all documented in detail in his autobiography. Some illnesses were probably due to his travels, which intensified starting from 1799.

=== Return to the University of Altamura ===
Following pain in his left side, he was advised by doctor Domenico Cotugno to return to his own city Altamura. In the University of Altamura, there weren't suitable teacher for the chair of mathematics. Cagnazzi convinced the then rector Gioacchino de Gemmis to add a mathematics course; until then just Euclidean geometry was taught. Cagnazzi had to obtain some credentials from the Chaplain Major in order to be hired as a teacher and he finally obtained the chair of mathematics in 1787. He later regretted coming back to his hometown since he preferred living in Naples, the capital of the Kingdom. Despite that, he was already appointed "Canon of Altamura".

Cagnazzi later had the chance to return to Naples, where he was able to deepen his knowledge in the field of mineralogy with the help of Alberto Fortis, with whom Cagnazzi remained in contact even after his return to Lombardy (in winter of 1789) through extensive correspondence and exchange of minerals.

In February 1790, while he was in Naples, Cagnazzi was appointed "Primicerio" of the Cathedral of Altamura and "had to doctorate in the ridiculous manner that was practiced in the College of the Prince of Avellino". In June of the same year he returned to Altamura and began to teach "the natural and rational philosophical course", replacing Giuseppe Carlucci, who had been teaching that course. Cagnazzi describes Carlucci as "highly skilled in ecclesiastical matters and rational philosophy" and contemptuous of the superstition "that was promoted by foolish priests".

In the years between 1790 and 1799 he used to visit quite often Naples and in the same years he was offered important ecclesiastical positions (including the bishopric) which Cagnazzi systematically refused. In his autobiography, he stated: "I confess that I did not despise the bishopric, but I did not want to bind myself to a very circumspect life, like that of a bishop at a young age like mine."

In the summer of 1798, Cagnazzi had to return to Altamura and in the meantime "the invasion of the French into the Kingdom was likely". The government in Naples then wanted to understand how many men fit for arms there were in the Kingdom of Naples in order to deploy an army that would counter the invasion. The Clergyman's Secretariat had data relating to marriages and births in the kingdom without any further information. The Major Officer then turned to Cagnazzi who gave his first proof of ability in calculations and, from that time, his technical competence made him much appreciated and requested by the Neapolitan government. In a few hours and by applying the "probability calculation according to statistical theories" starting from the above data alone, Cagnazzi calculated the number of men suitable for arms and, in addition, obtained other useful information "necessary for the good government of a nation". Cagnazzi drew up a table to be presented directly to the king of Naples and, as he himself recounts, "I had to struggle to give it the title "Statistical Table", since such a title sounded suche an act of vanity at that time, which shows how statistics was disregarded at that time here".

=== 1799 and the Altamuran Revolution ===
Flag of the Parthenopean Republic

At the beginning of 1799, the Kingdom of Naples experienced some upheavals that led to the establishment of the Parthenopean Republic. Many of Cagnazzi's friends, such as Francesco Conforti, Carlo Lauberg, Domenico Cirillo, Giuseppe Leonardo Albanese, and Ignazio Ciaja, were placed at the head of the provisional government. During this period, Cagnazzi was in Altamura, and according to his autobiography, some of them invited him to the capital, but Cagnazzi refused to get involved in the revolts, considering that "in such circumstances, similar to the agitation of fluids in vessels, the scum rises to the top and is usually skimmed off with a spoon.".

During the events of the Altamuran Revolution (1799), Cagnazzi was appointed Commissioner of the Canton of Altamura. However, he did not immediately accept and "reserved his decision."

Meanwhile, the fervent spirits of my homeland, including many students at our Lyceum, wanted to plant the tree and preached freedom and equality, which, either poorly announced or poorly understood by the people, was taken as a system of freedom and equality of goods, so they had begun to plunder the rich houses. One morning I was going to church while the people were being incited to this, and I was questioned by some peasants in the Piazza. I said that true freedom and equality was that taught to us by Jesus Christ in the Gospel, and I continued to the Church.Lamiavita, p. 17

According to Cagnazzi's testimony, such statements caused him the animosity and enmity of the revolutionaries ("the turbulent ones discredited me among the people, as I was from a noble and wealthy family"). The Lombard surgeon Attanasio Calderini, whom Cagnazzi considered a charlatan, had him appointed "Chancellor of the Municipality" (according to Cagnazzi, this was done to insult him), and Cagnazzi could not refuse since it was forbidden at the time to decline assigned positions. He held the position for eight days, after which he managed to obtain from the General the position (presumably less senior) of Commissioner of the Canton. Cagnazzi's account is confirmed by the memoirs of Vitangelo Bisceglia on the events of 1799.

On 22 March 1799, General Felice Mastrangelo and Commissioner Nicola Palomba arrived in Altamura, having been appointed heads of the Bradano Departmental Government by the provisional government of the Parthenopean Republic. Cagnazzi states that these were "ignorant, turbulent, bloodthirsty people, etc., who instead of promoting the republican system, discredited it with their actions." From that moment, "the fiercest enmity between Altamura and Matera erupted," and "a civil war began on the borders."

Cardinal Fabrizio Ruffo had already gathered an improvised army, the Army of the Holy Faith, to restore the kingdom to its previous government, and was approaching Matera. Ruffo's army was mainly composed of Calabrians, to which other people from neighboring towns had joined. Cagnazzi describes the Calabrians as "by their nature bloodthirsty and rapacious." According to his autobiography, Cagnazzi advised removing Palomba, Mastrangelo, and their followers, cutting down the Liberty Tree (planted in the center of Altamura's "market square"), and surrendering. For this, Cagnazzi risked being arrested as a "traitor to the homeland," while he believed he would have been the "savior of the homeland" if they had listened to him.

=== The peregrinations ===
It was decided to send someone to explore the intentions of the French general, and Palomba assigned Cagnazzi to this task. To avoid problems, Cagnazzi accepted the assignment and, as decided, left with a certain Paolo Nuzzolese towards Molfetta, Barletta, and Cerignola to speak with the French general, "but the French were retreating at a forced march." While Cagnazzi was about to return from Cerignola to Altamura, he met Palomba and Mastrangelo, who informed him of the fall of Altamura and their escape.

What happened in Altamura during the sack, I will not stop to recount here, having written about it elsewhere. I will only say that the atrocities committed by the Calabrians under the eye of Cardinal Ruffo are incredible.

— Lamiavita, p. 20.

Cagnazzi, Palomba, and Mastrangelo then decided to go to Naples. Upon arriving in Pomigliano d'Arco, Palomba flaunted "the same frenzy for republican power," while Cagnazzi informed the city officials of the events and the imminent fall of the republic. He also advised them to send delegates to Cardinal Ruffo. In Naples, Palomba, Mastrangelo, and Cagnazzi spoke with the Directory, and Cagnazzi recounted the events and gave "the faithful narrative of the outrages they had committed." Meanwhile, the Army of the Holy Faith had approached Naples, and on 12 June, the royalists had neared the Ponte della Maddalena.

In Naples, Cagnazzi found refuge at the house of Mr. Tommaso Montaruli and in the company of Canon Giambattista Manfredi. Later, Cagnazzi moved to the house of President Giuseppe de Gemmis, and at dawn the next day, he went to Castel Sant'Elmo, where many Jacobins were taking refuge under the walls, as they had not been allowed to enter the castle. He then returned to de Gemmis's house "with great peril.".

At that moment, I realized that I had much courage in the face of danger, much to my surprise. In the streets, shots were being fired between Calabrians and Patriots, and I saw many fall on both sides, but I believed I should walk moderately, otherwise, I would inevitably have been lost.

— Lamiavita, p. 22.

Subsequently, Cagnazzi moved to Castellammare di Stabia with the knight Giuseppe de Turris (who would later become a marquis). However, in that city, there were many Calabrians who had taken part in the Army of the Holy Faith and had even been in Altamura; these Calabrians began talking about Cagnazzi, and thus he had to flee by sea to Naples. He later encountered an armed man who asked to join him and then threatened him with a stiletto, tied him up, and robbed him of everything he had. Subsequently, Cagnazzi and his assailant were attacked by other armed villagers who took them both to a house, still tied up. The coachman, being free, went to tell the story to five nearby cavalry soldiers, who knocked on the door to enter. The villagers broke into the house and took the two to the prison of Pomigliano d'Arco. There, a lieutenant whom Cagnazzi had previously helped and Attanasio Calderini (for a large reward) identified and cleared Cagnazzi.

Cagnazzi then moved to Calabria and Sicily. On 25 August 1799, Cagnazzi boarded a "Dalmatian brig" in Messina bound for Trieste and Venice along with five Knights of Malta, including the Bailiff who was returning to Trieste. Due to a storm lasting three days, the brig was dragged to the shores of Africa, even risking an attack by Barbary pirates. They eventually reached the island of Zante and landed in Corfu and Trieste. Upon landing in Trieste, Cagnazzi had to stay in the city for several days, having been struck by a fever that had partially caused him to lose his hearing and sight. Forced by the police to leave Venice, Cagnazzi, in poor health, headed towards northern Europe.

He reached Graz, and, not being allowed to proceed to Vienna, he headed towards Switzerland, armed with a guidebook and a small German dictionary, and arrived in Brixen and Bormio. Here, too, he was ordered by a Russian officer to turn back immediately, so he decided to head back to Venice, where he was so bedraggled that the Police immediately allowed him to return home by gondola. Cagnazzi left Venice on 4 November 1799, passing through Bologna, Pistoia, and Prato.

In those years, Cagnazzi also received an offer of collaboration (in exchange for money) from a woman and a man who revealed themselves to be French spies supplying the Austrian army "at a loss" while observing its movements. Cagnazzi refused the offer, despite the couple proposing "any amount."

Upon arriving in Florence, Cagnazzi was offered the chair of political economy. During his approximately year-long stay in Tuscany, Cagnazzi had the opportunity to meet many illustrious literati and scientists, including Vittorio Alfieri, and he stated that his stay in Tuscany "was extremely delightful for me and forms a pleasant period of my life. There was not a day without a remarkable event that interested both my intellect and my heart."

During his peregrinations, Cagnazzi managed to receive money from his brother through a Jewish merchant with the intermediation of Marquis Giuseppe de Turris.

=== Return to the Kingdom of Naples ===
Following the death of his wife, Elisabetta de Gemmis, his brother Giuseppe de Samuele Cagnazzi asked Luca to return home since there was no longer anything to fear thanks to the signing of the Treaty of Florence and since Giuseppe had children who needed to be educated. Cagnazzi then decided to return from Tuscany, presenting himself in Rome to Cardinal Fabrizio Ruffo, then minister of Naples. After a long discussion between the two, Cagnazzi obtained a passport "without any clause". After a brief stay in Naples, where Cagnazzi regained the priestly garments he lost during the Altamuran Revolution, he arrived in Altamura on 23 December 1801.

=== The Napoleonic rule ===
In 1806, while Cagnazzi was in Altamura with Alessandro Nava as governor, he received a letter from his nephew informing him of the French entry into Naples. Cagnazzi and his brother Giuseppe promised assistance to Nava, who was exposed to the revenge of the Altamurans he had imprisoned.

During Joseph Bonaparte's visit in April 1806, Cagnazzi met André-François Miot, whom he had already known in Florence. Miot, already in Matera, asked Cagnazzi to come to Naples, wanting him by his side due to his considerable skills and technical and economic knowledge, but Cagnazzi states in his autobiography that he initially refused. Shortly after, Cagnazzi was sent to Naples as a member of the Altamura Deputation that had to go to Naples, and the new interior minister of the Kingdom of Naples ordered him to stay. He became a "first-class" professor of political economy at the University of Naples Federico II and also received some positions.

Cagnazzi was also involved in the affair of the so-called "secret licenses," with the complicity of Joachim Murat, aimed at bypassing the Continental Blockade.

=== The Restoration ===
With the return of the Bourbons, Cagnazzi found himself in a state of extreme agitation, "seeing many ominous preparations by the mob similar to those of the Parthenopean Republic" and was openly threatened. In the following years, Cagnazzi had to struggle greatly to receive any significant public appointments, although even the Bourbon politicians and the king himself did not want to forgo Cagnazzi's valuable expertise. Much space is given in the last part of his autobiography to the hostility of minister Nicola Santangelo towards him, whom Cagnazzi considered extremely ignorant and dishonest.

During the events of 1820, Cagnazzi was also accused at times of being a Carbonaro and at others of being a Calderaro and following. Also of historical interest is the spread of satire, of which Cagnazzi speaks in his autobiography, directed particularly against Count Giuseppe Zurlo, stemming from the promulgation of the constitution and greater freedom of the press.

=== The Meetings of Italian Scientists ===
After recovering from an illness, Cagnazzi set out to build with his own hands an instrument for measuring the tones of the human voice, which he called the tonograph. Following this invention, he was invited to the Third Meeting of Italian Scientists (1841), where he demonstrated the operation of his tonograph and, as he himself recounted, was showered with praise. Cagnazzi also had the opportunity to attend subsequent meetings of scientists, and in his autobiography, he provides very detailed accounts (even of the food consumed during dinners), of high historical value.

In particular, during the Third Meeting of Italian Scientists, the Grand Duchess of Tuscany, Princess Maria Antonia of the Two Sicilies, expressed her pleasure at seeing her fellow Neapolitans for the first time at a meeting of Italian scientists and stated that it was due to Cagnazzi.

=== The Constitution of 1848 and the trial ===
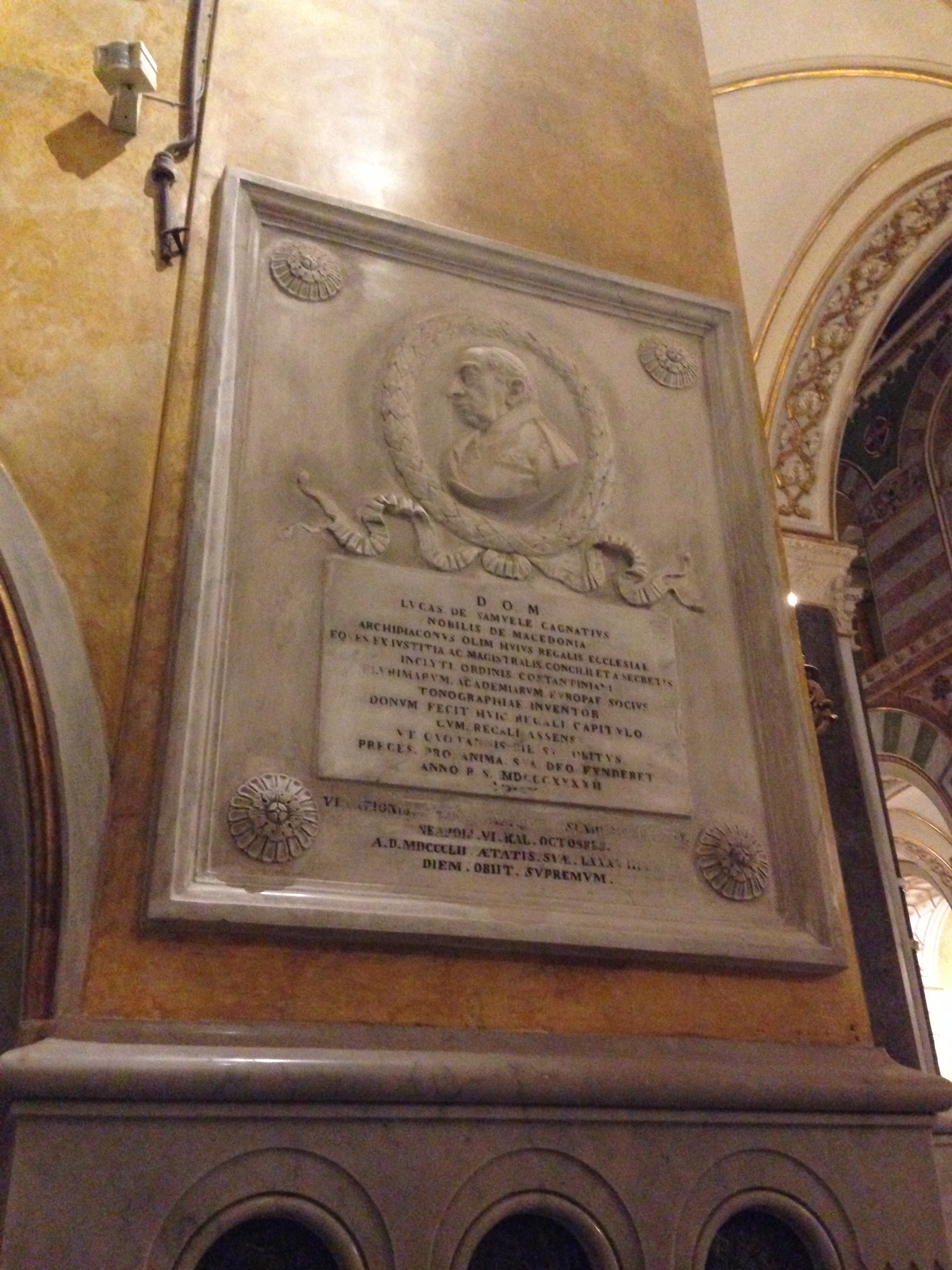
Commemorative plaque of Cagnazzi dating back to 1842 ("Chapel of San Giuseppe") in Altamura Cathedral.

In 1847, some riots occurred in Naples, and King Ferdinand II, pressured by the population, promised a constitution on 12 January 1847, "under the illusion that by recalling the German, or rather Austrian, army, as in 1821, they would later restore [the absolute monarchy]".

The following year, elections were held for the Parliament of the Two Sicilies, and at the age of eighty-four, Cagnazzi was elected deputy for both the Province of Naples and the Province of Bari; Cagnazzi renounced the seat for Naples and kept only the one for the Province of Bari. He was also appointed President of the new Parliament of the Two Sicilies.

On 15 May 1848, the parliament (located in the Chiostri di Monteoliveto) was surrounded by Swiss soldiers and lazzaroni; the deputies (Cagnazzi was in the company of, among others, the captain of the National Guard Giovanni La Cecilia) remained locked in the parliament until late, after sunset, fearing greatly for their lives.

That is why I urged everyone, especially some excited young men, to muster courage and await our fate. I then reminded my colleagues to imitate the Roman Senate [and] bravely await the Gauls in their place

— Lamiavita, p. 285.

Late at night, after sunset, two officers, one Swiss and one Neapolitan, informed them that they were free to leave. In those moments, Cagnazzi vowed to publish a new edition of his work The Precepts of Evangelical Morality if he were freed, and immediately tasked Don Vito Buonvento with it.

Two or three days after 15 May 1848, a trial was initiated against Cagnazzi; shortly after, he learned that an "insulting sheet [...] was found in which it was mentioned the deposition of King Ferdinand from the crown for having used an attack against the Parliament". Cagnazzi, both in his autobiography and during the trial, denied ever signing such a document:

I swear, and I pray anyone who will read this writing, that I never signed such a paper or another that offended the Royal Person whom I have always revered. It is not difficult to imitate my signature, so some scoundrel must have done it, but I firmly protest before God that I have not signed, I repeat, neither this nor any other offensive paper to the Sovereignty. I pray whoever wants to write my biography to make this clear at all times

— Lamiavita, p. 287.

To avoid arrest, Cagnazzi left the Kingdom of Naples and headed towards Livorno, although this pilgrimage did not last long due to his advanced age and his desire to spend the last moments of his life in his homeland.

In the final pages of his autobiography, presumably written in 1852, he states that he signed a letter (probably different in content from the contested one) addressed to the commander of the square to stop the firing:

Then almost all the Deputies urged me to write a letter to the Commander of the square to try to stop the fire, then I said, unable to resist negatively, that I would sign the letter to the commander, because there was no order or command, but a simple request, in fact a letter was conceived that I believed was not criminal, which I signed and it was sent

— Lamiavita, p. 299.

Historians seem to agree that Cagnazzi did not sign the document in question, as even Silvio Spaventa claimed not to have signed the document during the trial following the events of 15 May. Historian Cesare Spellanzon, however, "is of the opinion that Cagnazzi signed the Protest".

In the last pages of his autobiography, Cagnazzi states that, during his stay in Naples, being forced to stay at home, he was often threatened by the Bourbon police and was asked for money to avoid worse consequences. The corruption of the Bourbon police and the widespread presence of crime in the 1840s and 1850s are well documented, not only by Cagnazzi but also by more recent historical research. This would support the hypothesis that Cagnazzi did not sign any compromising document and that the charges of the trial were fabricated.

== Death ==
In 1852, at the age of eighty-eight, he suffered a fainting spell during a session of the trial and "out of compassion was relieved from the case and taken back home semi-conscious." Shortly after, afflicted by bronchitis and deeply embittered by the accusations, he died in Naples on 26 September 1852.

In the final pages of his autobiography, Cagnazzi exhibits all the signs of old age in his writing. He tends to repeat certain facts and considerations. In the last moments of his life, he reread the meditations contained in The Precepts of Evangelical Morality, a book written by himself that had made him quite famous among his contemporaries.

As recounted by his nephew Luca Rajola Pescarini in a letter to Ottavio Serena, Cagnazzi's funeral was very modest. Only relatives attended, as even friends and those who had benefited from Cagnazzi were afraid of compromising themselves by participating in the funeral of a person who had been put on trial and "kept under close watch by a ferocious [authority]." His body was buried in Naples in the ancestral chapel of the Rajola Pescarini family.

After 1860, below the commemorative plaque inside the Cathedral of Altamura, the following text was added:

Worn out by severe political vexations
At Naples on the 6th day before the Kalends of October in the year of the Lord 1852
at the age of seventy-eight
he breathed his last

— Commemorative plaque of the Cathedral of Altamura; cf. Lamiavita, p. 330, note 321.

== Honors ==
- Knight of Justice of the Sacred Military Constantinian Order of Saint George
- Knight (title held even after 1815 thanks to the Treaty of Casalanza)
- Beneficio semplice of San Vito in Vietri di Potenza
- Knight of the Royal Order of the Two-Sicilies

== Academies ==
- Member of the Accademia dell'Arcadia, with the title Arcade (1827–?);
- Founding member of the Accademia Pontaniana

== Relatives ==
- Ippolito de Samuele Cagnazzi – father
- Livia Nesti – mother
- Giuseppe de Samuele Cagnazzi (1763–1837) – brother
- Ippolito de Samuele Cagnazzi – brother
- Elisabetta de Gemmis (?-1799) – sister in law (Giuseppe's wife)
- Maria Elisabetta de Samuele Cagnazzi, nicknamed "Bettina" (1809–1900) – nephew
- Giuseppe Pomarici Santomasi – nephew
- Maria de Samuele Cagnazzi – nephew
- Pietro Martucci – grandnephew (Maria de Samuele Cagnazzi's son)
- Ippolito de Samuele Cagnazzi – nephew

== Works ==
- Istituzioni di matematica e fisica
- A qual secolo appartenga l'anno 1800. Risposta all'opuscolo: quando compiasi il secolo XVIII ed abbia principio il secolo XIX. Venezia: Stampe Giovanni Zatta, librajo di Frezzeria. 1800.
- Elementi dell'arte statistica. Vol. 1. Napoli: Stamperia Flautina. 1808.
- Elementi dell'arte statistica. Vol. 2. Napoli: Stamperia Flautina. 1809.
- Elementi di economia politica dell'arcidiacono Luca De Samuele Cagnazzi ad uso della Regia universita degli studi di Napoli. Napoli: Domenico Sangiacomo. 1813.
- Saggio sopra i principali metodi d'istruire i fanciulli. Napoli: Tipografia di Angelo Trani. 1819.
- "Sul periodico aumento delle popolazioni – Memoria letta nella Real Accademia delle Scienze di Napoli nel dì 16 aprile 1819". Tipografia di Angelo Trani. 1819.
- Saggio sulla popolazione del Regno di Puglia ne' passati tempi e nel presente. Naples: Tipografia Angelo Trani (vol. 1), Tipografia della Società Filomatica (vol. 2). 1839.
- Sul Tavoliere di Puglia Lettera del Caval. Luca de Samuele Cagnazzi ... al Signor Simonde de Sismondi. Napoli: Angelo Trani. 1820.
- I precetti della morale evangelica posti in ordine didascalico dall'arcidiacono Luca de Samuele Cagnazzi. Napoli: Tipografia di Angelo Trani. 1823.
- Su i valori delle misure e dei pesi degli antichi romani desunti dagli originali esistenti nel real museo borbonico di Napoli. Napoli: Tipografia di Angelo Trani. 1825.
- Analisi dell'economia privata e pubblica degli antichi relativamente a quella de' moderni. Napoli: Tipografia della Società Filomatica. 1830.
- Sul dissodamento de' pascoli del Tavoliere di Puglia e sull'affrancazione de' suoi canoni, Napoli, Tipografia della Società Filomantica, 1832.
- Tavole di mortalità in Napoli e nelle provincie ... lette ... 1828, 1832.
- Sul dissodamento de' pascoli del Tavoliere di Puglia e sull'affrancazione de' suoi canoni. Napoli: Stamperia della Società Filomatica. 1832.
- Elementi di cronologia matematica e storica per gli giovanetti. Napoli: Tipografia della Società Filomatica. 1838.
- Lettera al signor D. Matteo Augustinis sullo stato dell'economia e della statistica nel Regno delle Sicilie al cadere del secolo XVII e cominciamento del secolo XIX. Napoli: Stamperia della Società Filomatica. 1839.
- "Notizie varie di Altamura. Raccolte, e scritte da me Luca de Samuele Cagnazzi l'anno 1839". 1839., manoscritto conservato presso la biblioteca Archivio Biblioteca Museo Civico (A.B.M.C.) di Altamura
- Saggio sulla popolazione del Regno di Puglia (che contiene lo stato presente). Vol. 2. Napoli: Società filomatica. 1839.
- Tonographiae Excogitatio. Stamperia della Società Filomatica. 1841.
- La tonografia escogitata da Luca de Samuele Cagnazzi. Napoli: Stamperia della Società Filomatica. 1841.
- "Necrologio di Giovanni Battista Manfredi". Poliorama Pittoresco. VII: 349. 1843., contenuto in Michele Marvulli. "Il declino dell'Università di Altamura in un inedito di Luca de Samuele Cagnazzi": 195–197.
- Su la varia indole delle forze agenti nell'universo. Napoli: Stamperia della Società Filomatica. 1845.
- Alessandro Cutolo, ed. (1944). La mia vita. Milano: Ulrico Hoepli.
- Leges in Catholica Ecclesia vigentes apto ordine digestae.

=== Publications ===
- "Transunto d'un discorso meteorologico sugli anni 1792 e 1793". Opuscoli Scelti Sulle Scienze e Sulle Arti. 7. Milano: Giuseppe Marelli. 1794.
- Memoria sulle curve parallele di Luca Cagnazzi con due lettere dello stesso riguardanti la detta memoria dirette al Signor D. Giuseppe Saverio Poli, scritta tra il 1787 e il 1789, pubblicata dopo il 1794.
- "Considerazioni sugl'igrometri colla migliorazione di quello di Saussure". Memoria Letta All'Accademia dei Georgofili Il 25 Febbraio 1801.
- "Osservazioni e conietture sul male detto della Tarantola che domina nella campagna di Puglia". Memoria Letta All'Accademia dei Georgofili Il 18 Marzo 1801.

- "Congetture su di un antico sbocco dell'Adriatico per la Daunia fino al seno tarantino". Memorie di matematica e fisica della Società italiana delle scienze. XIII, parte II. Modena: Società Tipografica: 189. 1807.
- "Sull'uso delle osservazioni meteorologiche per ben dirigere la nostra agricoltura". Atti del Reale Istituto d'incoraggiamento. 1806.
- "Discorso sulle cause della sospensione delle terre nell'atmosfera". Memorie della Società Pontaniana di Napoli: 171–186. 1810.
- "Su lo stato naturale e sull'industria rurale della campagna di Puglia". Atti del Reale Istituto d'incoraggiamento. 1810.
- "Notizie dei prezzi di alcune derrate di alimento per più di due secoli". Atti della Società Pontaniana di Napoli. Stamperia Reale: 145. 1810.
- "La vaccinazione giova o no all'aumento della popolazione?". Annali Universali di Statistica. 27. Milano: Editore degli Annali universali: 153. 1831.
- "Sugli effetti risultanti all'umano intendimento dall'uso di meccanismi nelle arti e nelle scienze (memoria letta il 13 gennaio 1833 all'Accademia Pontaniana)".
- "Lettera del Cav. Luca de Samuele Cagnazzi al marchese Giuseppe Ruffo in occasione della memoria da questi pubblicata "Sull'utilità di migliorare razze equine di real conto"". Il Progresso delle Scienze, delle Lettere e delle Arti. X (4). Napoli: Tipografia Flautina: 209 e succ. 1835.
- "Sull'uso della sintesi e dell'analisi nell'istruzione delle scienze matematiche".
- "Sullo stato dei calori di Puglia".
- "Sulla temperatura di Napoli".
- "Volgarizzamento del quadro della vita umana di Cebete Tebano".
- "Sulla probabilità di vita nel Regno di Napoli".

=== Funeral praises ===
- Alla Santa Memoria di Leone XIII. Sommo pontefice. Elogio letto ne' solenni funerali. Napoli: Gennaro Palma. 1829.
- All'augusta memoria di Maria Cristina di Savoia. Regina delle Sue Sicilie. Elogio letto ne' solenni funerali. Napoli: Stamperia della Società Filomatica. 1836.

=== Court cases ===
- "Riconoscimento e liquidazione di credito a carico del Comune di Altamura – Ippolito e Luca de Samuele Cagnazzi". Repertorio Sull'amministrazione Civile Nel Regno delle Due Sicilie. 1. Napoli: Stabilimento Fu Migliaccio: 572. 1851.

=== Translations of Italian works ===
- Über den Wert der Masse und der Gewichte der alten Römer. Translated by Johan Heinrich Schubothe. Copenhagen. 1828.

== See also ==
- University of Altamura
- Tonograph
- Bank of the Tavoliere di Puglia
- Vitangelo Bisceglia
- Vincenzo Petagna
- Giuseppe Maria Giovene
- Marcello Papiniano Cusani
- Kingdom of Naples
- Kingdom of the Two Sicilies
- Southern Italy
- Altamura
- Archivio Biblioteca Museo Civico

== Bibliography ==
- Chiara Lippolis (2023). "Un'inedita memoria segreta di Luca de Samuele Cagnazzi". Altamura – Rivista storica – Bollettino dell'a.B.M.C (64): 143–161.
- Giuseppe Pupillo (2023). "Uno sconosciuto e inedito manoscritto di Luca de Samuele Cagnazzi a Madrid". Altamura – Rivista storica – Bollettino dell'a.B.M.C (64): 95–141.
- Nicola Roncone (2022). "Luca de Samuele Cagnazzi – Uomo di Puglia, di Scienze, di Stato e di Chiesa". Altamura – Rivista storica – Bollettino dell'a.B.M.C (63): 11–53.
- Rosaria Colaleo (2019). "L'antica università e la collezione del Gabinetto di Fisica e Mineralogia di Altamura". Altamura – Rivista storica – Bollettino dell'Archivio Biblioteca Museo Civico (60). Francesco D'Amato Editore: 27–41.
- Antonio Fiore (2019). Camorra e polizia nella Napoli borbonica (1840–1860) (PDF). Federico II University Press. ISBN 9788868870614.
- Ruggiero Di Castiglione (2010). La massoneria nelle Due Sicilie e i "fratelli" meridionali del '700 – Dal legittimismo alla cospirazione (vol. III). Gangemi Editore. ISBN 978-88492-6756-3.
- Ruggiero Di Castiglione (2013). La massoneria nelle Due Sicilie e i "fratelli" meridionali del '700 – Le Province (vol. IV). Gangemi Editore. ISBN 978-88492-2400-9.
- Anna Pietrofonte (2009–2010). "Il tarantismo in uno scritto inedito di Luca de Samuele Cagnazzi". Altamura – Rivista storica – Bollettino dell'Archivio Biblioteca Museo Civico (50–51): 3–54.
- Michele (Ninì) Marvulli (2007–2008). "Un esperimento di semina eseguito da Luca de Samuele Cagnazzi nel 1796". Altamura – Rivista storica bollettino dell'a.B.M.C. (48/49). Edizioni di Pagina: 215–230.
- Emilio Ricciardi (2006). "Calitri in una descrizione del 1838". Il Calitrano. 26 (33): 8–9. ISSN 1720-5638.
- Lucia De Frenza (2005). "Il patriota e la macchina elettrica. Alcune testimonianze poco note sull'interesse di Luca de Samuele Cagnazzi per la costruzione di strumenti di fisica". Anthropos & Iatria. 4: 82–88.
- Angelo Massafra, ed. (2002). Patrioti e insorgenti in provincia: il 1799 in Terra di Bari e Basilicata. Edipuglia. ISBN 978-88-7228-313-4.
- A. Garuccio; Barbara Raucci (2007). "Luca de Samuele Cagnazzi: professore di Fisica sperimentale e costruttore di macchine scientifiche per esperimenti sull'elettricità". Proceedings of the XXIX National Congress of the Society of Historical Studies of Physics and Astronomy (SISFA) Held in Naples-Avellino on June 3–6, 2004 – the Legacy of Fermi, Majorana and Other Topics. Naples: Bibliopolis: 119–122. See Colaleo, p. 39, note 27.
- Barbara Raucci (2003). La diffusione delle scienze nell'Università degli studi di Altamura: un difficile percorso di affermazione (PDF). Proceedings of the XXIII National Congress of History of Physics and Astronomy. Naples: Società Nazionale di Scienze Lettere e Arti di Napoli and INAF – Astronomical Observatory of Capodimonte, Naples. OCLC 5894423792. Archived from the original (PDF) on 26 August 2017.
- Barbara Raucci (2001). "Uno scienziato nel Regio Studio di Altamura: Luca de Samuele Cagnazzi". Altamura – Rivista storica – Bollettino dell'Archivio Biblioteca Museo Civico. 42: 151–172.
- Michele Marvulli (1996). "La visita della regina Maria Carolina ad Altamura nel 1797 (da un inedito di Luca de Samuele Cagnazzi)". Altamura – Rivista storica/Bollettino dell'a.B.M.C (37).
- B. Salvemini (1981). Economia e arretratezza meridionale nell'età del Risorgimento: Luca de Samuele Cagnazzi e la diffusione dello smithianesimo nel Regno di Napoli. Lecce: Milella.
- Alessandro Cutolo (1954). "Discorso commemorativo". Altamura – Rivista storica – Bollettino dell'Archivio Biblioteca Museo Civico. 1: 22–37.
- Francesco Stacca (1954). "Commemorazione di Luca de Samuele Cagnazzi nel centenario della morte". Altamura – Rivista storica – Bollettino dell'Archivio Biblioteca Museo Civico. 1: 13–17.
- L. Predome (1952). "Il centenario della morte di un grande altamurano Arcidiacono Luca de Samuele Cagnazzi, scienziato, filosofo, economista, matematico, archeologo". La Disfida. Rivista bimestrale di letteratura, arti, scienze. 4: 3–10.
- G. Carano Donvito (1929). "I principi di politica economica di Luca de Samuele Cagnazzi". Journal degli economisti e rivista di statistica. XI: 1–60.
- C. Villani (1904). Scrittori e artisti pugiesi antichi, moderni e contemporanei. Trani: Vecchi. pp. 939–941.
- Antonio Jatta (1887). "Luca de Samuele Cagnazzi". Rassegna Pugliese (11): 163–165.
- Cesare Spellanzon (1938). Storia del Risorgimento e dell'Unità d'Italia – Volume IV° - Dall'inizio della guerra del 1848 all'armistizio Salasco. Milan: Rizzoli.
- Raffaele De Cesare (1813). "Luca de Samuele Cagnazzi, un'antica ed una nuova università nelle Puglie". Rassegna Pugliese. 3: 82–83.
- Andrea Tripaldi (1841). "Elogio storico del canonico arciprete Giuseppe Maria Giovene". Memorie di matematica e fisica della Società italiana delle scienze residente in Modena. 22. Modena: Tipi della R. D. Camera.
- Carlo Denina (1800). Delle Rivoluzioni d'Italia – Libri venticinque. Vol. 5. Venezia: Tipografia di Antonio Curti q. Giacomo. p. 234.
- Atti della Real Società Economica di Firenze ossia de' Georgofili. Vol. 4. Firenze: Stamperia del Giglio. 1801. pp. 102–103.
