= San Samuele =

San Samuele (Italian for 'Saint Samuel') may refer to:

- San Samuele, Venice, a church in Venice, Italy
- Teatro San Samuele, a former opera house and theatre in Venice, Italy

== See also ==
- Saint Samuel
- Saint-Samuel, Quebec
- Samuele
