= Carluccio =

Carluccio may refer to the following:

- Carluccio (surname), Italian surname
- Carluccio's Ltd, an Italian restaurant chain in the United Kingdom
