= Giuseppe Carlucci =

Italian astronomer and scholar

- Born: 1710 ca.
- Died: 1790 ca.
- Occupations: Astronomer, professor
- Years active: 18th century

Giuseppe Carlucci (1710 ca. - 1790 ca.) was an Italian professor and astronomer. He was one of the first professors teaching at the University of Altamura (1747-1812).

== Life ==
Giuseppe Carlucci was born in 1710 ca., probably in Altamura, since some contemporaries stated that he was from Altamura. He was primicerius of Altamura Cathedral and, most importantly, he was one of the earliest professors of the University of Altamura (in 1749, he was appointed as professor of philosophy and geometry). He was described as a professor "of supreme justice, probity and humanity". Luca de Samuele Cagnazzi, in his autobiography, remembers him as an open-minded person, who "hated the superstition promoted by silly priests". Moreover, he studied mathematics and philosophy on his own, since at that time there were few people with knowledge in the above subjects.

Marcello Papiniano Cusani, rector of the new University of Altamura, had to propose the names of skilled professors to the Court of Naples; those professors had to be both skilled and morally irreproachable. As a proof of his scientific skills, Giuseppe Carlucci wrote a short essay in which he proved the certainty of the Earth's motion, dismissing the beliefs and opposition widespread at that time. His work was greatly appreciated in Naples, and particularly by the Cappellano Maggiore of Naples, Msgr. Celestino Galiani who praised him in a letter written on 30 November 1748:

I'm astonished that in the provinces of the kingdom there are so skilled people and with such a deep knowledge. Don't delay appointing him as professor of philosophy and mathematics in those royal schools in accordance with the Sovereign intentions of His Majesty.

— Msgr. Celestino Galiani

In this work, Carlucci exhibited a remarkable level of scientific skills, and proved that he was updated on the latest scientific authors and developments of science. Most importantly, he knew about the different interpretations given to Isaac Newton's Principia at that time in England. Carlucci died in 1790 circa, probably in Altamura, and was replaced by his pupil and assistant Luca de Samuele Cagnazzi.

He was member of the Accademia dei Venturieri di Monopoli and, during their meetings as well as in class, he used to explain that apparently supernatural phenomena could often be explained through science; one of those were the "phantoms", which were just vapours and miasma coming out of the decaying corpses.

== The Ragionamento filosofico ==
The only work that, at the current state of research, can be attributed to Giuseppe Carlucci is the Ragionamento filosofico intorno al moto della Terra, written and spread in 1748, but published anonymously only in 1766. The scholar Barbara Raucci suggested that the essay wouldn't have been published if Giuseppe Carlucci hadn't met Emmanuele Mola in the Accademia dei Venturieri di Monopoli, who decided to publish it in order to educate those who didn't have any knowledge of astronomy and mathematics, and to pleasure those who already had that knowledge. In the preface, written by Emmanuele Mola and published together with the work, it is written that the author is unknown, while in the last part of the preface it is written that this work was snatched away from its author and published.

Carlucci's work consists of two parts; in the first part, Copernicus and Isaac Newton's theories are explained, while in the second part he refutes the defensive theses of those who defended the geocentric system both through scientific and theological reasoning. Moreover, Carlucci proved that he knew of the most recent theories interpretations on astronomy and physics, including the theories of William Whiston and James Bradley and even Baruch Spinoza's pantheism.

Carlucci defends the heliocentric system by employing some reasonings which were quite common among the enlightened scientists and dating back to Galileo Galilei. He wrote that the Holy Scriptures had been written to spread moral values and they were meant to be understood by "vulgar and rough people"; they weren't meant to provide details on how nature or the universe works. Furthermore, he stated that, for the Catholic Church, denying the validity of the heliocentric system means to foster derision among the unbelievers.

=== Freemasonry ===
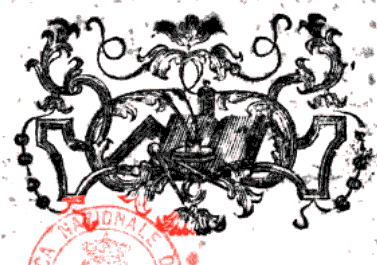
The decoration on the frontispiece

The frontispiece of Giuseppe Carlucci's work is not particularly decorated. There is only a drawing, depicting a book, a compass, a square, a lamp and an inkwell. The scholar Barbara Raucci hypothesized that it denotes the Freemasonry, and that Giuseppe Carlucci (or whoever published the book) may have joined a secret society. According to some scholars, it is likely that, in the mid-18th century, there was already a Masonic lodge in the city of Altamura.

== Career ==
- Professor at the University of Altamura (1749-1790) - replaced after death by Luca de Samuele Cagnazzi.
- Member of the Accademia dei Venturieri di Monopoli, nicknamed il Grave.

== Works ==
- Carlucci, Giuseppe (1766). Ragionamento filosofico intorno al moto della Terra. Naples: Vincenzo Flauto. (written in 1748, and published anonymously in 1766)

== Bibliography ==
- Barbara Raucci (2003). La diffusione delle scienze nell'Università degli Studi di Altamura: un difficile percorso di affermazione (PDF). Società Nazionale di Scienze, Lettere e Arti di Napoli e INAF - Osservatorio Astronomico di Capodimonte, Napoli.
- Barbara Raucci (2012). "Il Ragionamento filosofico intorno al Moto della Terra e gli Elementi di fisica composti ad uso della Regia Università di Altamura" (PDF). Antropologia e Scienze Sociali a Napoli in Età Moderna. Aracne editrice srl. Archived from the original (PDF) on 2020-07-12.
- Vincenzo Vicenti (1998). Arcangela Vicenti; Giuseppe Pupillo (eds.). Medaglioni altamurani del 1799. Cassano Murge. Archived from the original on 2021-07-18.
- Luca de Samuele Cagnazzi (1944). Alessandro Cutolo (ed.). La mia vita. Milan: U. Hoepli.
- Angelo Massafra (2002). Patrioti e insorgenti in provincia: il 1799 in terra di Bari e Basilicata. Edipuglia srl. ISBN 978-8872283134.
- Pietro Sisto (2002). I fantasmi della ragione: letteratura scientifica in Puglia tra Illuminismo e Restaurazione. Schena. p. 24. ISBN 978-8882293079.

== See also ==
- University of Altamura
- Altamura
- Luca de Samuele Cagnazzi
