= Carluccio (surname) =

Carluccio is an Italian surname. Notable people with the surname include:

- Angela Carluccio (born 1972), Italian politician
- Antonio Carluccio (1937–2017), Italian chef, restaurateur and food expert
- Jarrod Carluccio, (born 2001), Australian professional footballer
- John Carluccio, American film director

== See also ==
- Carluccio (disambiguation)
- Carlucci
