= Ferrante de Gemmis =

Italian philosopher (1732–1803)

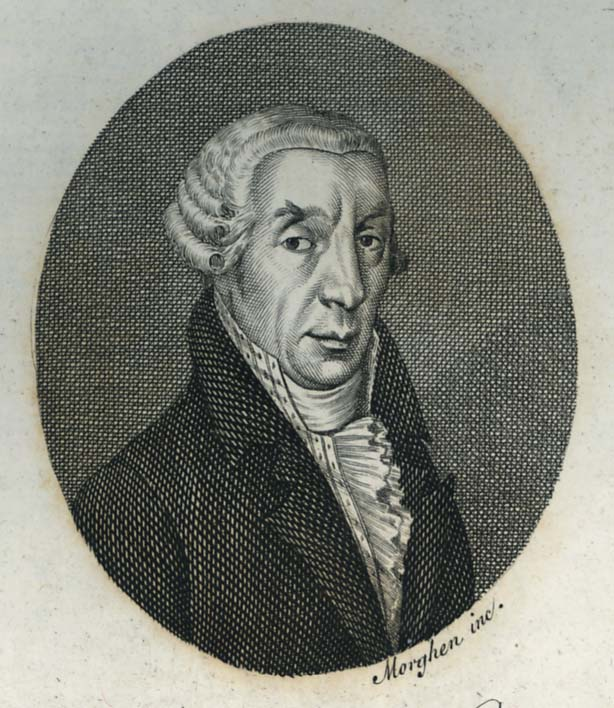

Ferrante de Gemmis (April 14, 1732 – April 21, 1803) was an Italian philosopher and literary man.

== Biography ==
Ferrante de Gemmis was born in Terlizzi, near Bari. His parents were the Baron Tommaso de Gemmis and Francesca Bruni. He was educated in Naples where he graduated in law. He inherited the properties of his uncle Minister Ferrante Maddalena. De Gemmis was a friend of the philosopher and political economist Antonio Genovesi. He founded an Academy in Terlizzi becoming the primary exponent of Illuminism in the region of Apulia. He refused to become a judge so he could continue writing about philosophy even though he wrote in anonymity for modesty.

His portrait is in the Dictionary of the notable people of the Reign of Naples.

== Death ==
He died in Terlizzi on April 21, 1803.

=== References ===
- Gaetano Valente Feudalesimo e feudatari Terlizzi nel Settecento, Mezzina, 2004. Molfetta;
- Cabreo de Gemmis, Biblioteca Provinciale "de Gemmis", Bari.
