= Archivio Biblioteca Museo Civico =

Archivio Biblioteca Museo Civico (A.B.M.C.)
- Location: piazza Zanardelli, 30 – Altamura, Italy, Italy
- Established: October 19, 1949; 76 years ago

Collection
- Size: 90,000 books

Other information
- Director: Giuseppe Pupillo
- Website: www.abmcaltamura.it

The Archivio Biblioteca Museo Civico (also A.B.M.C.) is an organization which mainly serves as library and museum and it is located in Altamura, Italy. The archive and library comprise about 90,000 books, mostly about history and literature, among which are scrolls and books dating back to Middle Ages and the 16th century. A.B.M.C. also includes books from the former city library Biblioteca Comunale, replaced by A.B.M.C. in ca. 1950. The number of books has dramatically increased over the years.

The library stores valuable books and archeological finds, such as the cofanetto limosino, the tonograph and both ancient and modern art paintings. It also stores some bone fragments believed to have been from Dante Alighieri's hand. Indro Montanelli also mentioned it in his book Dante Alighieri (booklet number 4 of series "I Protagonisti", published and sold in 1993 together with Italian newspaper Il Giornale).

Among the oldest books are 18 incunabula and 434 cinquecentine (16th century books) as well as many books from the 17th and 18th centuries.

== History ==
The idea of creating an association for the conservation of Altamura's cultural heritage came from count Celio Sabini, who, in a letter written on 6 September 1946 to the director of Biblioteca Comunale prof. Francesco Lospalluto, expressed his wish to create a non-profit organization. The letter came together with a donation of 1122 books e 562 booklets.

The idea of count Celio Sabini was disccused on 4 November 1948 in a meeting inside the Biblioteca Comunale, during which the proposal to create Archivio Biblioteca Museo Civico was approved. The organization officially started on 19 October 1949 with the signing of the founding documents in front of notary Ferdinando Schifini.

== See also ==
- Altamura

== Sources ==
- Berloco, Tommaso (1985). Storie inedite della città di Altamura. ATA – Associazione Turistica Altamurana Pro Loco.
