= Alessandro Cutolo =

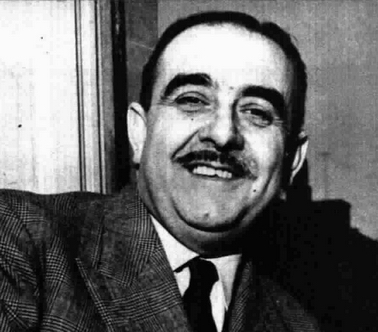
- Born: 28 March 1899; Naples, Italy
- Died: 14 March 1995 (aged 95); Milan, Italy

Aldo Alessandro Cutolo (28 March 1899 – 14 March 1995) was an Italian academic, television presenter, actor and historian.

Born in Naples, after studying under Benedetto Croce and teaching medieval history at the University of Rome, in 1928 Cutolo was commissioned to "provide to the direction, the system and the enhancement of the Historical Archive of City of Naples." In 1935 he moved to Milan where he became professor of Bibliography and Library Science at the University of Milan.

Between 1954 and 1968 he got large popularity as presenter of Una risposta per voi, one of the earliest cultural programs broadcast on Italian television. Author of several books and essays and director of the magazine Historia, Cutolo was also active as a character actor, often alongside Alberto Sordi.
