= Gioacchino de Gemmis =

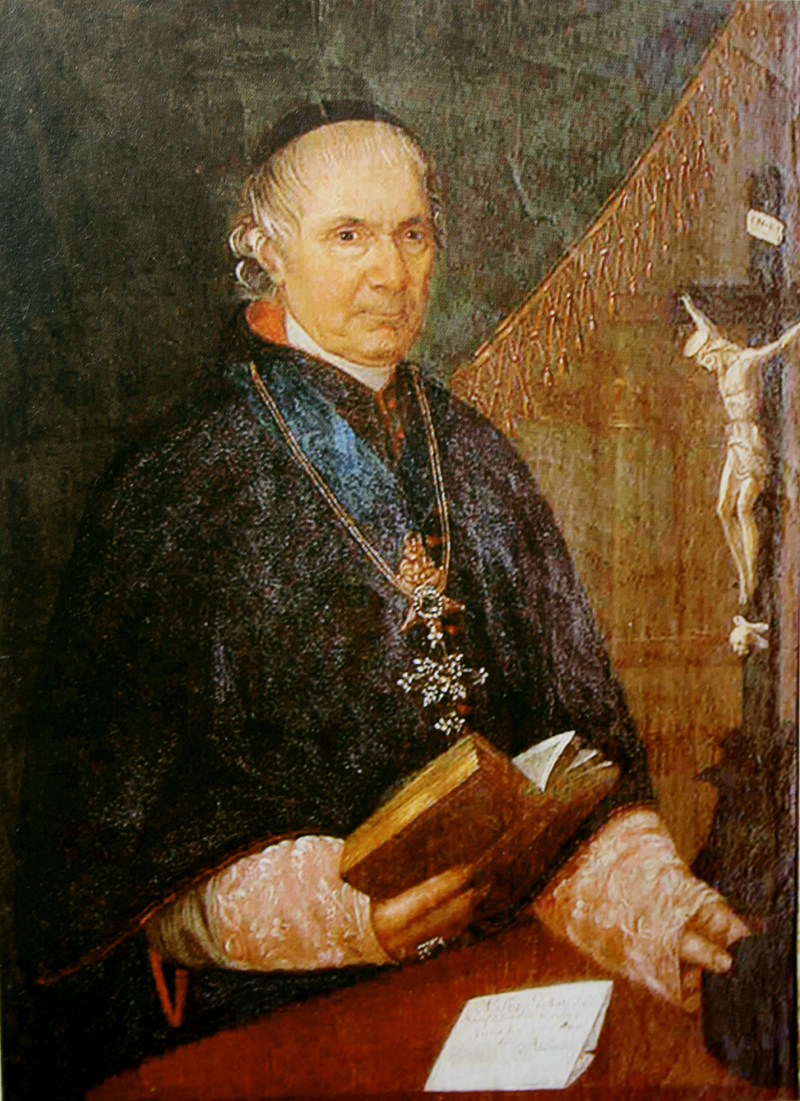
- Gioacchino de Gemmis

Personal details
- Born: 4 October 1746 Terlizzi
- Died: 12 December 1822 (aged 76) Terlizzi
- Denomination: Catholicism
- Occupation: First bishop of Altamura; Archpriest of Altamura Cathedral; Prelate nullius; Rector of the University of Altamura
- Coat of arms

Gioacchino de Gemmis (4 October 1746 - 12 December 1822) was a Catholic bishop, archpriest, prelate and rector of the University of Altamura. He's best known for his role in the so-called Altamuran Revolution (1799), advocating peace and helping the refugees, who had fled Altamura after the battle with the Sanfedisti, to be allowed in Terlizzi.

== Life ==
Gioacchino de Gemmis was the seventh of eight children of baron Tommaso de Gemmis and Francesca Bruni, belonging to the barons of Cannavalle, Gioacchino de Gemmis was initiated into the ecclesiastical career and took sacred orders in 1770. He moved to Naples, where he graduated both in civil and canon law, was appointed in 1774 as archdeacon of the Terlizzi Cathedral and, in 1776, he was appointed as vicar of the diocese of Giovinazzo and Terlizzi.

In 1783, he became archpriest of the Altamura Cathedral. He became first bishop of Altamura, and during the period 1789–1818, he was also prelate nullius, after the nomination by Pope Pius VI.

He was also appointed as rector of the University of Altamura, established in 1748 by his predecessor Marcello Papiniano Cusano, with the purpose of promoting, together with the teachings of his friend Antonio Genovesi, the study of natural sciences with a special focus on agriculture. The university included courses ranging from economics and law to scientific subjects, with the help of the vicar Vitangelo Bisceglia, who promoted in particular the study of botany thanks to research conducted with Vincenzo Petagna and Michele Tenore. The reform of the University of Altamura promoted by de Gemmis was intended to stimulate economic development by teaching young people the new science applied to production systems. Many students from neighboring cities attended the new courses of botany, of mineralogy, of chemistry and physics, with the help of academic and mathematician Luca de Samuele Cagnazzi. De Gemmis collected many books and founded a university library.

Pope Pius VI, recognizing his merits, appointed him as titular bishop of the Diocese of Listra in 1798. He also restored and embellished Altamura Cathedral, which he reconsecrated on 7 October of the same year, as written on the plaque.

In 1799, during the so-called Altamuran Revolution, by risking his life, he went in person outside the city in order to talk to cardinal Fabrizio Ruffo and persuade him to let Altamuran rioters flee; nonetheless Fabrizio Ruffo denied his request. Because of this, king Ferdinand IV of Naples suspended him from his ecclesiastical functions on the charge of having favored the republican regime.

During Joseph Bonaparte's rule of the Kingdom of Naples, he was re-established and, in 1808, he promised to be loyal to the new king Joachim Murat. In 1818, he was promoted bishop of the Diocese of Melfi-Rapolla-Venosa, serving with wisdom and charity.

He was decorated with the knight's cross of the Kingdom of the Two Sicilies. He died in Terlizzi on 12 December 1822 and he was buried inside the de Gemmis family chapel.

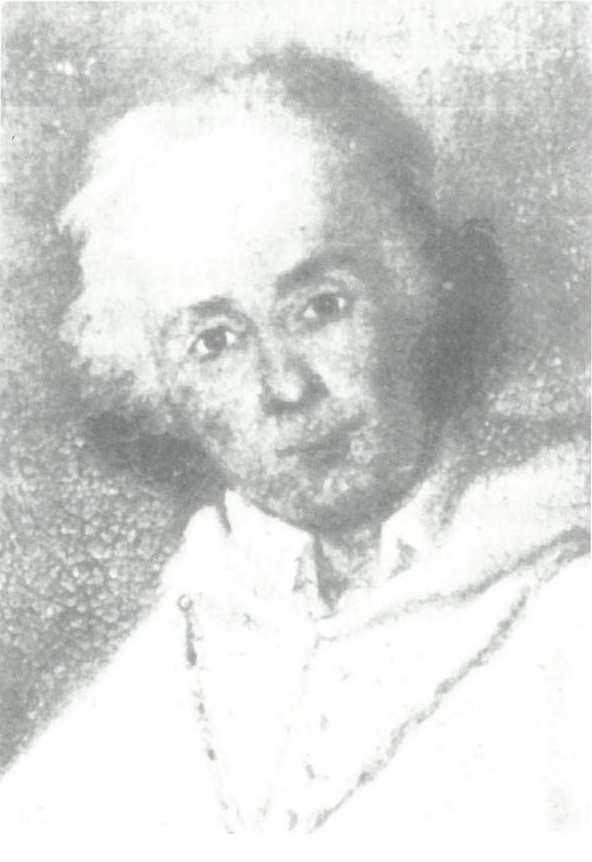
Gioacchino de Gemmis

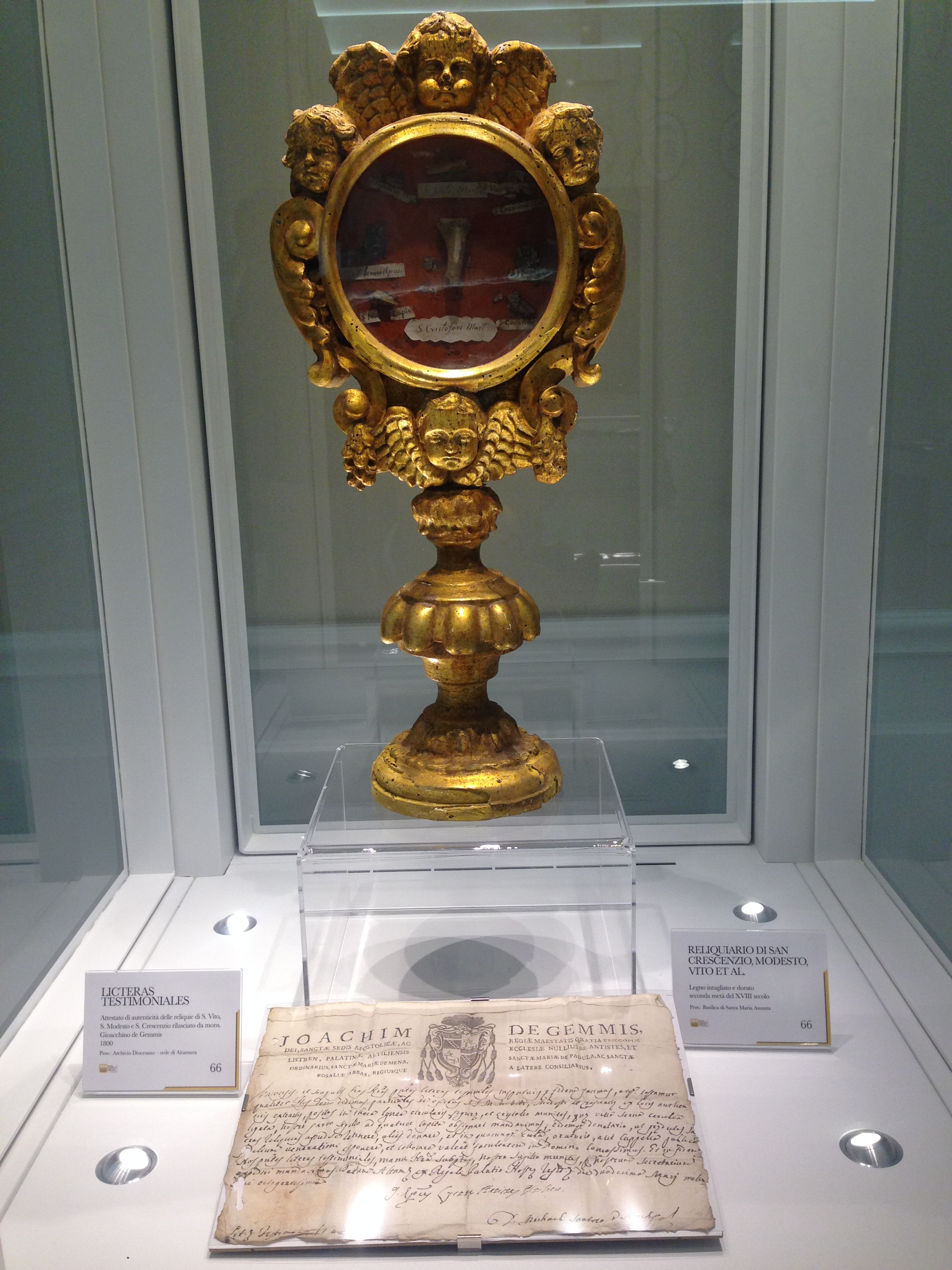
Reliquary authenticated by Gioacchino de Gemmis (second half of the 18th century, exhibited in Altamura Diocesan Museum Matroneum)

== The Altamuran Revolution ==
Gioacchino de Gemmis distinguished himself for his authentic pastoral spirit and showed courage and unexpected mental openness. He always supported Altamuran people, first taking part in the planting ceremony of the Liberty Tree in the main square of the city (piazza del Mercato, today called piazza Duomo) and then ordering a Te Deum to be played that same evening inside Altamura Cathedral.

During the clashes he went to Ruffo himself, asking in vain to forgive rioters and risking his life in doing this. Unlike what happened to Raffaele Vecchioni and the two engineers Vinci and Olivieri, Gioacchino de Gemmis was allowed to return.

Being him from Terlizzi, he helped the refugees who had fled Altamura on the night of 9 May 1799, after the fall of the city, to be allowed in Terlizzi.

== Episcopal genealogy ==
- Cardinal Scipione Rebiba
- Cardinal Giulio Antonio Santori
- Cardinal Girolamo Bernerio, Ordine dei frati predicatori
- Archbishop Galeazzo Sanvitale
- Cardinal Ludovico Ludovisi
- Cardinal Luigi Caetani
- Cardinal Ulderico Carpegna
- Cardinal Paluzzo Paluzzi Altieri degli Albertoni
- Pope Benedict XIII
- Pope Benedict XIV
- Pope Clement XIII
- Cardinal Marcantonio Colonna
- Cardinal Giacinto Sigismondo Gerdil, Chierici regolari di San Paolo
- Cardinal Giulio Maria della Somaglia
- Archbishop Camillo Cattaneo della Volta
- Bishop Gioacchino de Gemmis

== See also ==
- Altamura
- Terlizzi
- Altamuran Revolution
- University of Altamura
- Luca de Samuele Cagnazzi
- Vitangelo Bisceglia

== Bibliography ==
- Gaetano Valente Feudalesimo e feudatari. Terlizzi nel Settecento, Mezzina, Molfetta 2004.
- Ottavio Serena L'Università degli studi di Altamura.
- Luca de Samuele Cagnazzi, La mia vita.
- Ernesto Bosna Le scuole universitarie altamurane, in Per una storia della scuola di Terra di Bari, p. 101-102.
- Cabreo de Gemmis, Biblioteca Provinciale "de Gemmis", Bari.
- Giuseppe Bolognese (1999). Zecher la chorban - Memoria del sacrificio. Tipografia Castellano - Altamura.
- Domenico Sacchinelli (1836). Sulla vita del cardinale Fabrizio Ruffo (PDF). Tipografia di Carlo Calanco.
