= Sparano =

Sparano is a surname. Notable people with the surname include:

- Giuseppe Sparano (1709–1776), Italian cleric and polemicist
- Tony Sparano (1961–2018), American football coach
- Tony Sparano Jr. (born 1986), American football coach
