= Vitangelo Bisceglia =

Italian philosopher and botanist (1749–1822)

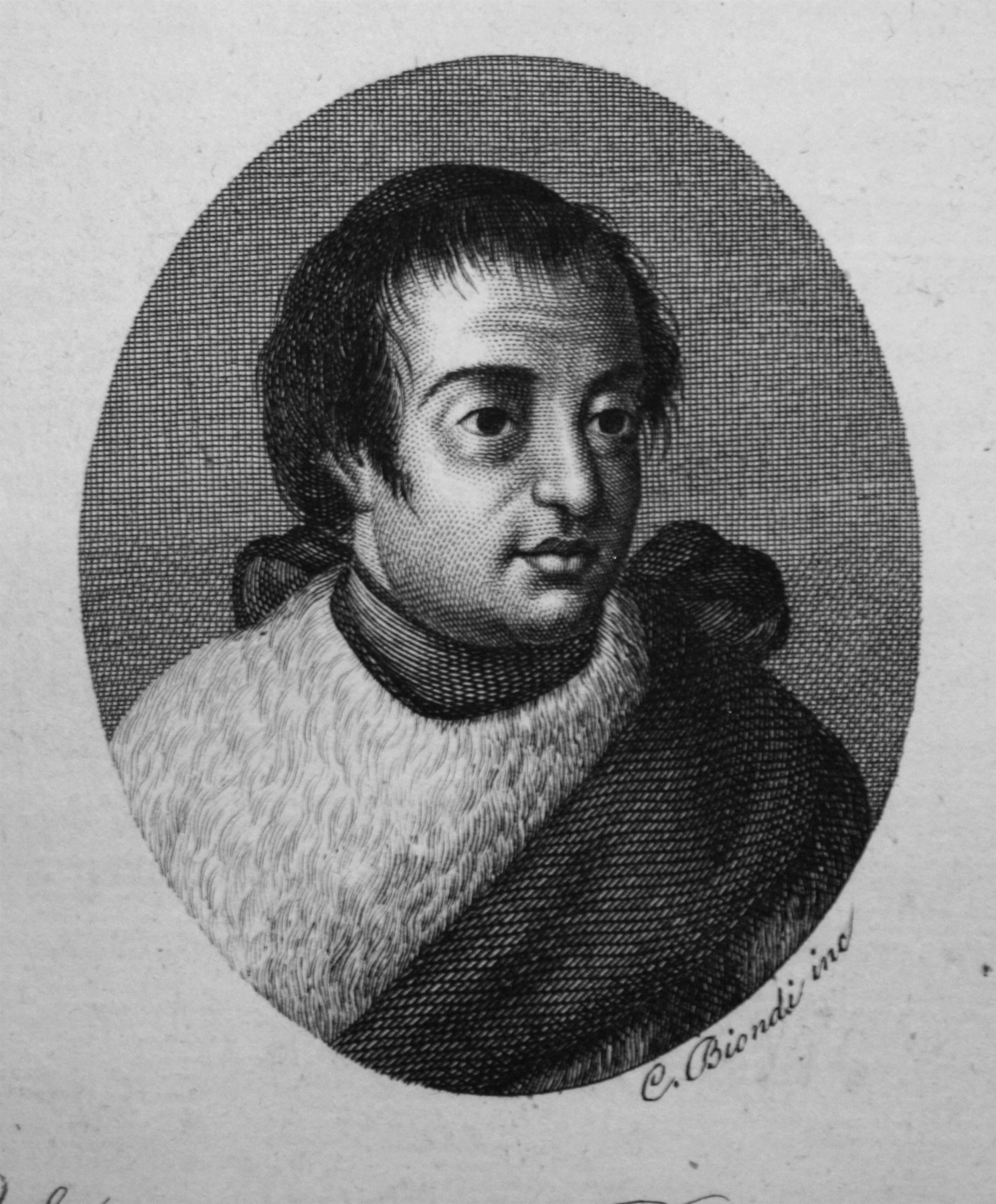
- Vitangelo Bisceglia
- Born: November 30, 1749; Terlizzi
- Died: October 14, 1817 (aged 67); Terlizzi
- Occupations: botanist, agronomist, professor

Vitangelo Bisceglia (30 November 1749 – 14 October 1822) was an Italian botanist, agronomist and professor. He taught inside the University of Altamura. Because of his being a polymath, he's been described as "an encyclopedic spirit, the honor of the Muses".

== Life ==
Vitangelo Bisceglie was born in Terlizzi, Kingdom of Naples on 30 November 1749. His father was Francesco Bisceglia, while his mother was Chiara Teresa Carnicella. As a child he was very lively and intelligent. At the age of fourteen, he dressed the clerical dress and the bishop of the time, Msgr. Orlandi, was so impressed that he said, "Vitangelo will become a famous birbone, or a distinguished scholar". He studied Ancient Greek, Latin, French, philosophy, mathematics and anatomy.

He was admired and respected by many scholars of his time, and he began to bring his teachings to Terlizzi, in order to revitalize the academy established by Ferrante de Gemmis. At the age of 21, he started a correspondence with Antonio Genovesi whose answers are published in his Libro delle lettere familiari. Letters of Antonio Genovesi to Bisceglia were headed to Donna Orsola Garappa of Monopoli, a student of Vitangelo Bisceglia and wife to Michele Lioy of Terlizzi.

He then went to Calabria to teach the daughters of Princess Motta Ruffo di Calabria, close relative of the cardinal Fabrizio Ruffo and later in 1776 he graduated both in civil law and canonical law in Naples.

In 1783 he accepted the invitation of rector Gioacchino de Gemmis becoming vicar of Altamura's clergymen and also teacher of the University of Altamura, where Luca de Samuele Cagnazzi was already teaching physics. De Gemmis was also very happy with his idea of reorganizing the professorships; after the publication of his first essay on law in which he defended the rights of Altamura Cathedral against the claims of the bishop of Gravina, Bisceglia obtained many offers of promotion to be a bishop, but he refused in order to continue his research on botany, publishing, in collaboration with famous botanist Vincenzo Petagna, a Memory on the causes of tetanus (Italian: Alla scoperta delle cause che procurano il tetano) and he also wrote about philosophy, economics, botany and agriculture, as well as two short essays about local history, even going back to prehistory.

He contributed to the writing of the chronicles of the events of Altamuran Revolution (1799) with his work "Memories of events in Altamura from January to May 1799" (Italian: Memorie storiche di Altamura dal gennaio al maggio 1799), being at that time moderator of the local university. He wrote numerous orations, pronounced eulogies in Terlizzi Cathedral for important events, such as the death of notable people or celebratory events related to politics.

As mentioned above, he also wrote a work about law, showing that he was also a talented jurist and historian, in the age-old dispute with the bishop of Gravina on the privileges of Altamura Cathedral and his "royal patronage", which means his being subject only to the king. In fact, he demonstrated that the privileges and tax exemptions enjoyed by Altamura Cathedral were legally right and encompassed by the law of the kingdom. In his work, he explained the results of his research and it was very well received, especially in the city of Altamura. His research went back as far as the Middle Ages, by including the decrees enacted by Frederick II of Hohenstaufen.

He was also a member of the Accademia dei Forti in Rome, Accademia dei Georgofili in Florence, Royal Society of Encouragement to Natural Sciences of Naples and of various other academies. He died in Terlizzi on 4 October 1817, apparently killed by the gout.

== Works ==
- Alla scoperta delle cause che procurano il tetano e il torcimento di collo delle pecore
- Catalogo sulle piante tintorie della provincia di Bari
- Del moto spontaneo degli ulivi
- Sulle malattie delle piante cereali
- Sulla degenerazione del frumento
- Di un asfodelo solstiziale
- Sulla coltura del cotone
- Sulle piante utili
- La flora della Provincia di Bari
- Erbario
- Memorie apologetiche critico-storiche della città di Terlizzi
- Memorie storiche di Altamura dal gennaio al maggio 1799
- * Difesa dei dritti e prerogative della real chiesa di Altamura contro le pretensioni del Vescovo di Gravina, Altamura, 7 maggio 1795

== See also ==
- Gioacchino de Gemmis
- Luca de Samuele Cagnazzi
- Altamuran Revolution
- Vincenzo Petagna

== Bibliography ==
- Gaetano Valente, Feudalesimo e feudatari Terlizzi nel Settecento, Molfetta, Mezzina, 2004.
- Francesco Paolo De Ceglia (2007). Scienziati di Puglia: secoli V a.C.-XXI. Vol. 3. Adda. ISBN 9788880826811.
- AA.VV. (1822). Biografia degli uomini illustri del Regno di Napoli, ornata de'loro rispettivi ritratti compilata da diversi letterati nazionali. Vol. 9. Nicola Gervasi.
- Gian Carlo Berarducci; Vitangelo Bisceglia (1900). Cronache dei fatti del 1799. Vol. 9. Nicola Gervasi.
- Barbara Raucci (2003). La diffusione delle scienze nell'Università degli Studi di Altamura: un difficile percorso di affermazione (PDF). Società Nazionale di Scienze, Lettere e Arti di Napoli e INAF - Osservatorio Astronomico di Capodimonte, Napoli.
