= Altamura Diocesan Museum Matroneum =

- Museo Diocesano Matronei Altamura (MUDIMA)
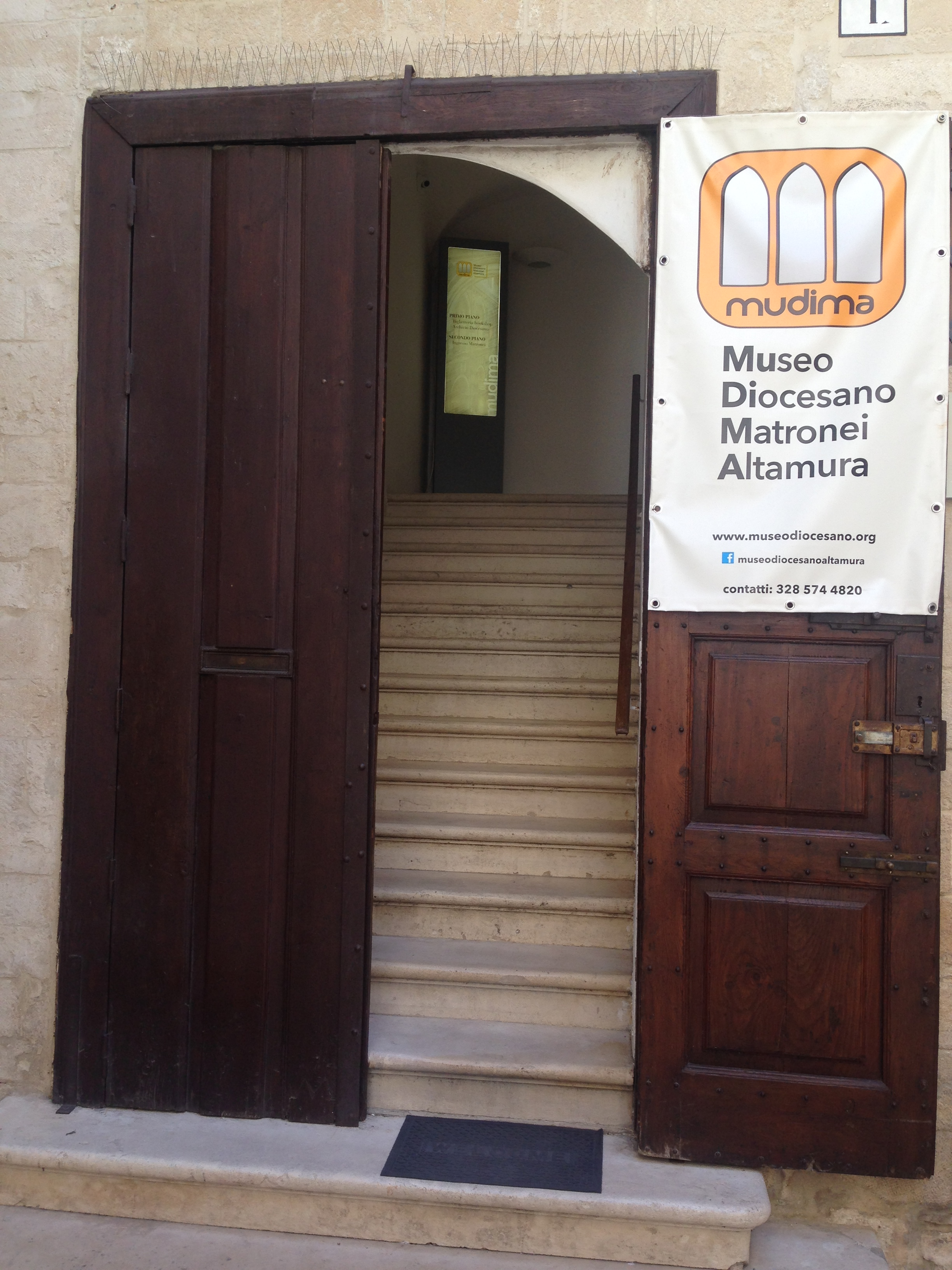
- Entrance of Altamura Diocesan Museum Matroneum
- Established: 2016
- Location: Arco Duomo, 1- Altamura, Italy
- Coordinates: 40°49′39″N 16°33′11″E
- Founder: Msgr. Giovanni Ricchiuti
- Website: http://museodiocesano.org

Altamura Diocesan Museum Matroneum (Italian: Museo Diocesano Matronei Altamura, also MUDIMA) is a museum located inside Altamura Cathedral, whose entrance is on the left side of the church's main entrance. It is located on the second and third floors, in the so-called matroneum of Altamura Cathedral. Among other things, the museum holds statues from the Middle Ages, the XV and XVI centuries. Books, notary letters, reliquaries as well as most of the cultural heritage collected in Altamura Cathedral over the centuries are on exhibition inside the museum. The so-called Murat's cloak is also on exhibition.

== History ==
The museum opened in 2016, thanks to Msgr. Giovanni Ricchiuti, bishop of the diocese of Altamura-Gravina-Acquaviva delle Fonti.

== See also ==
- Altamura
- Archivio Biblioteca Museo Civico
- University of Altamura

== Bibliography ==
- Berloco, Tommaso (1985). Storie inedite della città di Altamura. ATA - Associazione Turistica Altamurana Pro Loco.
