= Giovanni Michele Saraceni =

Italian Catholic cardinal

His Eminence Giovanni Michele Saraceni
- Cardinal-Bishop of Sabina
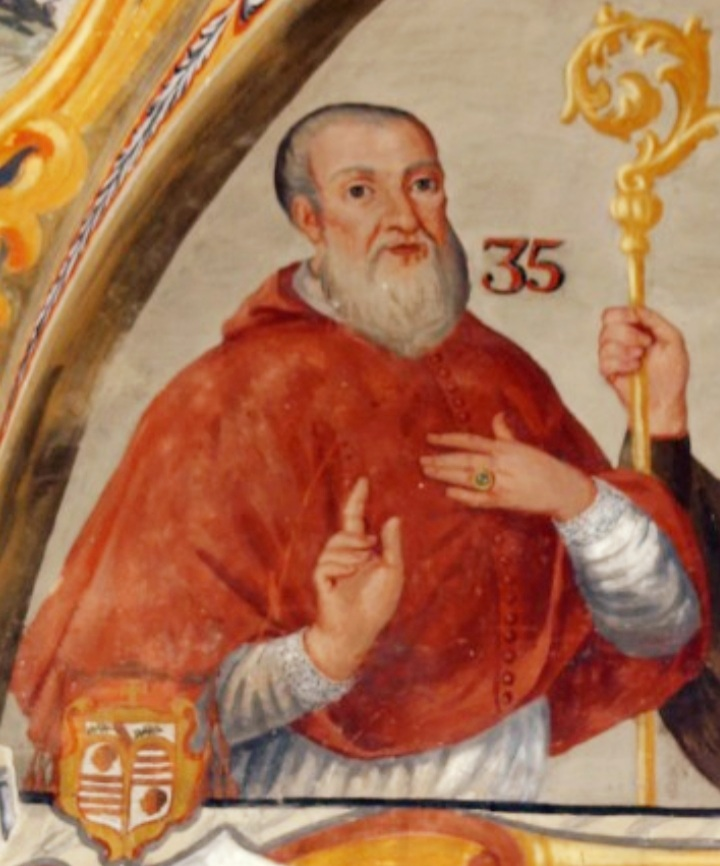
- Church: Catholic Church

Orders
- Consecration: 23 March 1536 by Antonio Sanseverino
- Created cardinal: 20 November 1551 by Pope Julius III

Personal details
- Born: 1 December 1498 Naples, Italy
- Died: 27 April 1568 (age 69) Rome, Italy

Giovanni Michele Saraceni (1 December 1498 – 27 April 1568) was a Cardinal of the Roman Catholic Church.

== Biography ==
Saraceni was born in Naples and was a relative of Cardinal Fabio Mignanelli.

He was the archbishop of Acerenza and Matera from 1536. On 23 Mar 1536, he was consecrated bishop by Antonio Sanseverino, Archbishop of Taranto, with Lorenzo Santarelli, Bishop of Pult, and Giacomo Ponzetti, Bishop of Molfetta, serving as co-consecrators. He was made cardinal on 20 November 1551 by Pope Julius III.

He took part in revising the acts of the Council of Trent, and in other Papal missions, including investigating the charges against Cardinal Carlo Carafa.

Cardinal Saraceni died in Rome in 1568.

== Episcopal succession ==
Episcopal succession of Giovanni Michele Saraceni

While bishop, he was the principal consecrator of:

- Girolamo Seripando, Archbishop of Salerno (1554);
- Adriano Fuscone, Bishop of Aquino (1554);
- Gerolamo Melchiori, Bishop of Macerata (1554);
- Fabio Capelleto, Bishop of Lacedonia (1555);
- Virgilio Rosario, Bishop of Ischia (1555);
- Antonio Ghislieri, Bishop of Nepi e Sutri (1556);
- Sigismondo Saraceno, Archbishop of Acerenza e Matera (1556);
- Flavio Orsini, Bishop of Muro Lucano (1561);
- Annibale Saraceni, Bishop of Lecce (1561);
- Mario Carafa, Archbishop of Naples (1566); and
- Pietro Lunello, Bishop of Gaeta (1566),

== External links and additional sources ==
- Cheney, David M. "Archdiocese of Acerenza". Catholic-Hierarchy.org. (for Chronology of Bishops) ^{[self-published]}
- Chow, Gabriel. "Archdiocese of Acerenza (Italy)". GCatholic.org. (for Chronology of Bishops ^{[self-published]}

Catholic Church titles
Preceded by Andrea Matteo Palmieri	Archbishop of Acerenza e Matera; 1531–1556	Succeeded by Sigismondo Saraceno
Preceded by Francisco Mendoza Bobadilla	Cardinal-Priest of Santa Maria in Ara Coeli; 1551–1557	Succeeded by Clemente d'Olera
Preceded by Giovanni Poggio	Cardinal-Priest of Sant'Anastasia; 1557–1565	Succeeded by Scipione Rebiba
Preceded by Braccio Martelli	Administrator of Lecce; 1560	Succeeded by Annibale Saraceni
Preceded by Fulvio Giulio della Corgna	Cardinal-Priest of Sant'Agata de' Goti; 1565	Succeeded by Giovanni Battista Cicala
Preceded by Tiberio Crispi	Cardinal-Priest of Santa Maria in Trastevere; 1565–1566	Succeeded by Giovanni Ricci
Preceded by Tiberio Crispi	Cardinal-Bishop of Sabina; 1566–1568	Succeeded by Giovanni Battista Cicala
