= Marcello Papiniano Cusani =

Roman Catholic Bishop

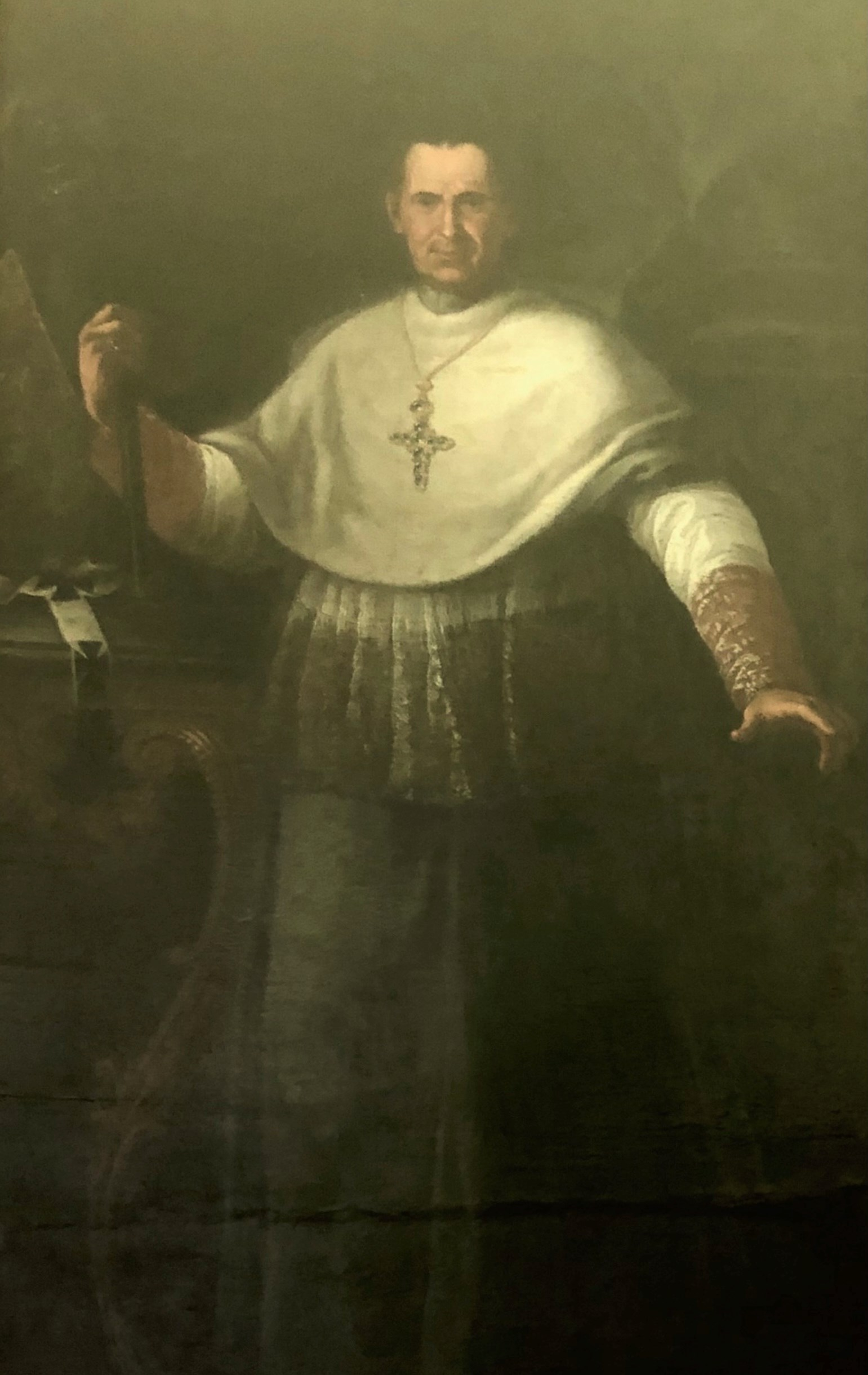
- Archdiocese: Archdiocese of Otranto; Archdiocese of Palermo

Personal details
- Born: February 17, 1690 Frasso Telesino, Italy
- Died: October 1766 (aged 76) Naples
- Buried: Church of Santa Maria della Verità, Naples
- Denomination: Catholicism
- Occupation: Professor of law Rector of the University of Altamura; Archbishop

Marcello Papiniano Cusani (17 February 1690 - October 1766) was an Italian archbishop, professor of both civil law and canon law (Italian: diritto civile and diritto canonico, also entrambi i diritti) as well as founder and rector of the University of Altamura.

== Life ==
=== Early years ===
Marcello Papiniano Cusani was born in Frasso Telesino on February 17, 1690 to Antonio Cusani and Antonietta Rainone. Notable family members included Biagio Cusani, poet and professor of law in Naples and Gennaro Cusani (uncle of Marcello) who was also professor of law. After receiving basic education, he went to Naples, where he studied law under the guidance of his uncle Gennaro and Basilio Giannelli.

At that time, Marcello was influenced by the ideas of his uncle (who was both against the Jesuits and the Spanish rule) and by the Neapolitan cultural environment of that period. In 1709, influenced by the Congregazione dei padri pii operai and their leader father Torres (an enlightened clergyman), Marcello decided to start an ecclesiastical career. On 10 June 1713 he became a priest.

=== Teaching in Turin and the period in Vienna ===
In 1720, Cusani was entrusted with the task of "substitute for the old Digest" in the University of Naples.

In 1723, he also won the contest for the chairs of civil and canon law, and thus he was appointed professor of both of them. He also accepted the offer to teach civil law at the University of Turin and in 1724 he moved to Turin. He remained there until 1730, when the new king, Charles Emmanuel III imposed restrictions on the freedom of teaching and religion.

In 1730, he left Turin and went to Vienna urged by his longtime friend Pietro Giannone, who was in that period was in Vienna. After a few years, however, Cusani decided to return to Naples, where he became a teacher of law and ecclesiastical history at the University of Naples, where he had, among his students, Ferdinando Galiani, Giuseppe Palmieri and Antonio Genovesi.

=== The founding of the University of Altamura ===
In 1746, Cusani was appointed archpriest of Altamura Cathedral where he carried out reforms in the spirit of the so-called giannonism (based on the ideas of Pietro Giannone), aimed at affirming the king's privileges over those of the clergy. He developed works of reform of the clergy and had the idea of establishing a university of studies in the city, using the revenues of the so-called Monte a Moltiplico.

Funding for the project had begun in 1640, to turn the arciprelatura nullius of Altamura into a bishopric. Cusani's idea was to use the savings of Monte a Moltiplico in order to establish a university and guarantee a public and royal education. The idea pleased the then king of Naples, Charles III of Spain, who was interested in limiting the dominance of the Church in the education of the youths.

Marcello Papiniano Cusani was the founder of the University of Altamura, implementing the incorporation of the two functions of rector and archpriest of Altamura Cathedral in the same person. This feature of dual office remained for the entire life of the university. The first to become both rector of the university and archpriest of the cathedral was Cusani himself, who was also a teacher of law therein; from 1747 to 1752, he directed both the university and the cathedral but, following disagreements with the local clergy, he decided to leave the city asking Galiani to allow him to "leave". The university he founded remained open until the beginning of the 19th century.

=== Archbishop in Otranto and Palermo ===
On March 3, 1753, Cusani was consecrated bishop in Rome and later became archbishop of Otranto. The office of archbishop of Otranto lasted only a few months, since on 27 February 1754 Charles III of Spain chose him for the position of archbishop of Palermo. According to some sources, he left Otranto on 11 February 1754.

In Palermo, unlike Altamura, Cusani enjoyed greater power, by virtue of his office as archbishop, and this made the reforms he adopted more incisive, aimed at asserting the supremacy of the sovereign over feudal local power. Moreover, from a purely cultural point of view, he reformed juridical and philosophical studies in order to reduce the dominance of the Jesuits and, in addition, he contributed to spread the ideas of John Locke.

=== Last years and death ===
Elderly and affected by blindness, on July 16, 1762 Cusani resigned from the archdiocese of Palermo and returned to Naples. There, he was welcomed by his friend Ignazio Della Croce, general of the Augustinians. Cusani joined the order of the Augustinians and remained there until 1766, the year of his death. The exact date of his death is unknown. His remains were buried in the Church of Santa Maria della Verità.

== Notable relatives ==
Marcello Papiniano Cusani had two notable relatives, his granduncle, Biagio Cusano, poet and professor of Canoni della mattina. He apparently died of apoplexy in 1683. He wrote many works, published and unpublished.

His uncle, Gennaro Cusano, was a lawyer and professor of canon law. On 18 July 1703, he was assigned the chair of professor of Sacri canoni matutina. He also taught many notable people of that period, among which Giacomo Castelli.

== Offices ==
- Sostituto del digesto vecchio in Studio di Napoli (1720-1723?)
- Professor of civil law and canon law in Naples (1723-1724)
- Profesore di diritto civile all'Università di Torino (1724-1730)
- Archpriest of Altamura (1747-1752) o (1725-1727) o (1725-1730)
- Rector of the University of Altamura (1747-1752)
- Archbishop of Otranto (1753-1754)
- Archbishop of Palermo (1754-1762)
- Prince of Accademia del Buon Gusto (1754-?)
- Prince of Accademia delle Scienze e delle Arti
- President and General Captain of the Kingdom of Sicily
- Domestic prelate of pope Benedict XIV
- Assistant bishop of Soglio pontificio and of the Council of S.R.M.
- Apostolic general commissioner of Tribunale della Santissima Crociata of the Kingdom of Sicily and its adjacent islands

== Works ==
Marcello Papiniano Cusani didn't publish any of his works. Through some research in Italian archives and libraries, a few manuscripts were discovered. All of them are related to his university lectures.

- Institutiones Iuris Ecclesiastici (work in two volumes, one in Naples and one in Palermo);
- Institutiones Iuris Ecclesiastici (work in four volumes which date back to his period in Altamura and stored in Bari in Biblioteca provinciale "G. De Gemmis");
- Institutiones Iuris Ecclesiastici (two works respectively in three and four volumes, both of which stored in Archivio Biblioteca Museo Civico, Altamura).

== Bibliography ==
- Difesa dei diritti del seminario di Altamura intorno ai beni di sua dotazione. Prato: Tipografia Fratelli Giachetti. 1867.
- Origlia, Giangiuseppe (1754). Istoria dello studio di Napoli. Vol. 2. Torino: Giovanni Di Simone.
- Notizie per l'anno 1762. Roma: Stamperia del Chracas. 1762.
- Macchi, Antonio Maria Leone (1759). Ragguaglio delle contraddizioni sostenute dalla pastorale vigilanza di monsignore D. Marcello Papiniano Cusani per occasione di un editto da lui pubbblicato il 2 ottobre 1755. Lucca.
- Vallauri, Tommaso (1875). Storia delle università degli studi del Piemonte. Napoli: Stamperia reale di G.B. Paravia E C.
- Raucci, Barbara (2003). La diffusione delle scienze nell'Università degli Studi di Altamura: un difficile percorso di affermazione (PDF). Società Nazionale di Scienze, Lettere e Arti di Napoli e INAF - Osservatorio Astronomico di Capodimonte, Napoli.
- Gisondi, Antonio (1979–1980). "Marcello Papiniano Cusani (1690-1766): regalismo e riformismo nella sua esperienza civile e pastorale altamurana". Altamura - Bollettino Dell'a.B.M.C. (Archivio Biblioteca Museo Civico). 21–22: 87.
- Gisondi, Antonio (1985). "CUSANI, Marcello Papiniano". Dizionario Biografico degli Italiani (in Italian). Vol. 31: Cristaldi–Dalla Nave. Rome: Institute of the Italian Encyclopaedia. ISBN 978-88-12-00032-6.
