= Ricchiuti =

Ricchiuti is an Italian surname. Notable people with the surname include:

- Adrián Ricchiuti (born 1978), Argentine-Italian footballer and coach
- Giovanni Ricchiuti (born 1948), Italian bishop
