= Petagna =

Petagna is a surname. Notable people with the surname include:

- Andrea Petagna (born 1995), Italian footballer
- Francesco Saverio Petagna (1812–1878), Italian Catholic bishop
- Vincenzo Petagna (1734–1810), Italian biologist and physician, director of the Monte Oliveto botanical gardens
- Andrew Petagna (born 1991), American computer teacher
