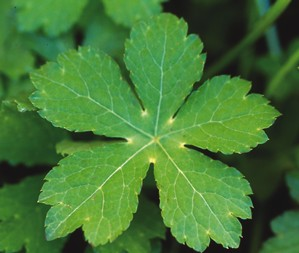

Conservation status
- Endangered (IUCN 3.1)

Scientific classification
- Kingdom: Plantae
- Clade: Tracheophytes
- Clade: Angiosperms
- Clade: Eudicots
- Clade: Asterids
- Order: Apiales
- Family: Apiaceae
- Subfamily: Apioideae
- Tribe: Saniculeae
- Genus: Petagnaea; Caruel
- Species: P. gussonei

Binomial name
- Petagnaea gussonei (Spreng.) Rauschert

Synonyms
- Petagnia saniculifolia Guss.; Sison gussonei Spreng.

= Petagnaea =

Genus of flowering plants

Petagnaea is a monotypic genus of flowering plants in the family Apiaceae. Its only species is Petagnaea gussonei. It is named after Neapolitan botanist Vincenzo Petagna (1734-1810). It is found only in Sicily, in Mediterranean-type shrubby vegetation, and is threatened by habitat loss.

== See also ==
- Vincenzo Petagna
- Royal Society of Encouragement to Natural Sciences of Naples
