= Archdiocese of Acerenza =

Archdiocese in southern Italy

Coordinates: 40.8000°N 15.9500°E

Archdiocese of Acerenza Archidioecesis Acheruntina Italian

Catholic
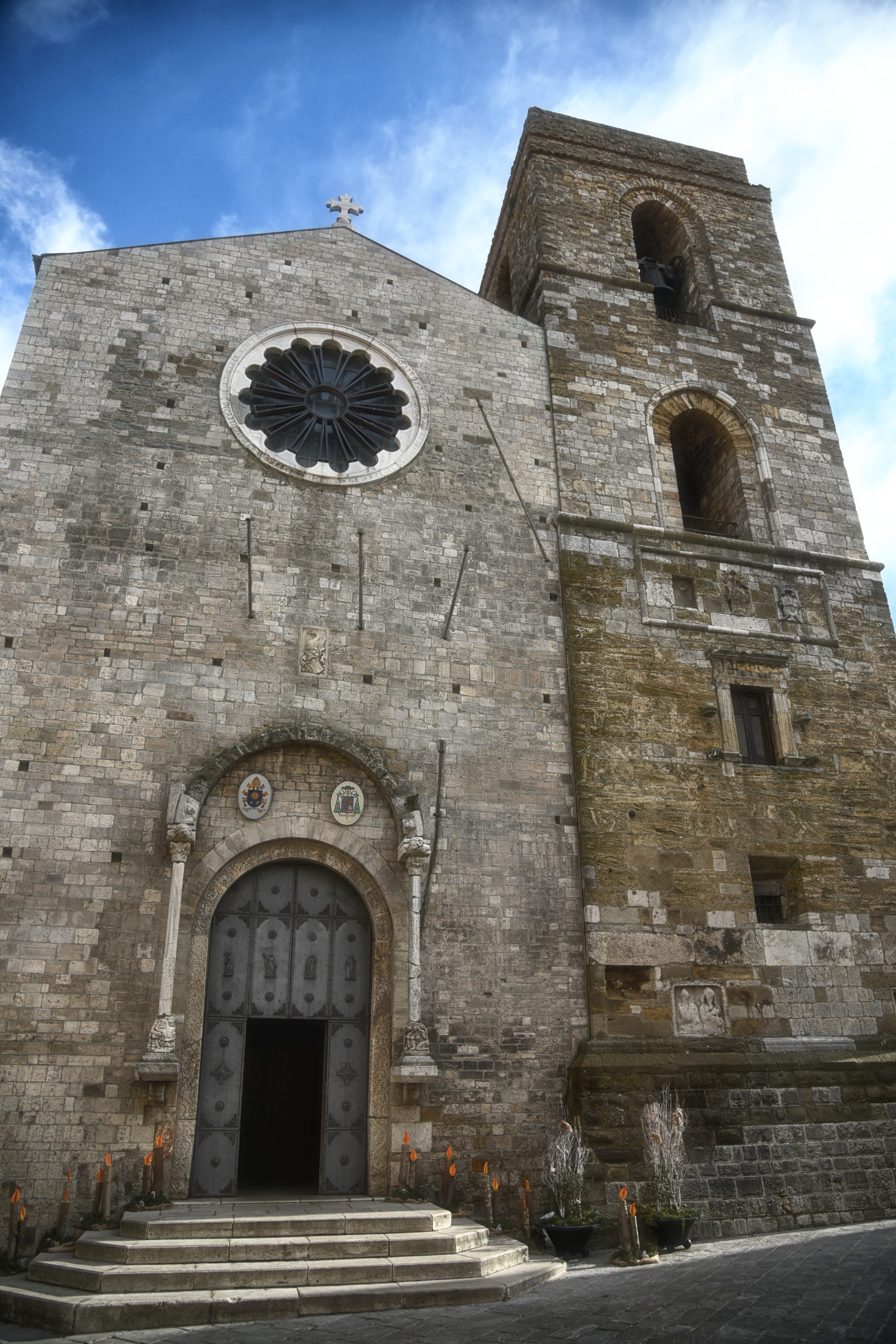
- Acerenza Cathedral

Location
- Country: Italy
- Ecclesiastical province: Potenza-Muro Lucano-Marsico Nuovo

Statistics
- Area: 1,250 km^{2} (480 sq mi)
- Population: Total; Catholics: (as of 2023); 39,590 ▼; 39,200 (est.) ▼ (99%)
- Parishes: 21

Information
- Denomination: Catholic Church
- Rite: Roman Rite
- Established: 4th century
- Cathedral: Cattedrale dell’Assunzione della B. Maria Vergine
- Secular priests: 33 diocesan ▼1 Permanent Deacon

Current leadership
- Pope: Leo XIV
- Archbishop: Francesco Sirufo

Website
- www.diocesiacerenza.it

The Archdiocese of Acerenza (Latin: Archidioecesis Acheruntina) is a Latin archdiocese of the Catholic Church in southern Italy, included in the provinces of Lecce and Potenza. It has existed as a diocese since the fourth or fifth centuries. In the 11th century it was elevated to an archdiocese.

In 1203, the archdiocese of Acerenza was united with the diocese of Matera to form the Archdiocese of Acerenza and Matera, with one and the same person being bishop of both dioceses, while the two dioceses each maintained their separate existence. Matera was separated again in 1954, recreating the Archdiocese of Acerenza, which briefly lost its metropolitan status as a suffragan of the archdiocese of Potenza in 1976. It regained its status as an archdiocese in 1977. Its metropolitan is the Archdiocese of Potenza-Muro Lucano-Marsico Nuovo.

== History ==
Acerenza was certainly an episcopal see in the course of the fifth century, for in 499 we meet with the name of its first known bishop, Justus, in the Acts of the Roman Synod of that year. The town was known in antiquity as the "high nest of Acherontia".

Acerenza was in early imperial times a populous and important town, and a bulwark of the territory of Lucania and Apulia. In the Gothic and Lombard period it fell into decay, but was restored by Grimoald II, Duke of Beneventum (687-689). An Archbishop of Acerenza (Giraldus) appears in 1063 in an act of donation of Robert Guiscard to the monastery of the Santissima Trinità in Venosa. Guiscard himself, who died on 17 July 1985, was buried there.

For a few years after 968 Acerenza adopted the Greek Rite in consequence of an order of the Byzantine Emperor Nicephorus Phocas (963-969), whereby it was made one of five suffragans of the archdiocese of Otranto, and compelled to acknowledge the jurisdiction of the Patriarch of Constantinople. In May 1041, Bishop Stephan (1029–1041) died in battle, fighting for the Greeks against the Normans.

At the synod held by Pope Nicholas II at Melfi in August 1059, the archbishop of Acerenza and Archbishop Arnulf of Cosenza were delegated to find appropriate bishops for the vacancies at Montepeloso and Tricarico. It is conjectured that the title of archbishop and was awarded to Acerenza by Pope Nicholas, since Pope Alexander II (1061–1073) in 1068 merely confirmed the existence of the title of archbishop Arnaldus. Archbishop Arnaldus attended the consecration of the abbey church of Montecassino on 1 October 1071.

In the struggle between the archdiocese of Salerno and its suffragan dioceses, Conza and Acerenza, Pope Urban II ruled on 20 July 1098 that both were subject to Salerno.

=== Metropolitan ===
On 16 June 1102, Pope Paschal II confirmed for the archbishop of Acerenza all his diocese's privileges and possessions, including his metropolitan status and the suffragan (subordinate) dioceses of Venosa, Gravina, Tricarico, Tursi, and Potenza, whose bishops he had the right of confirming and consecrating. On 1 April 1151, Pope Eugenius III confirmed the privilege of Pope Paschal II, as did Pope Alexander III on September 1179.

There is evidence that the diocese of Matera had been joined to the Archdiocese of Acerenza by 1199, and that the archbishops enjoyed the episcopal income of Matera.

Pope Urban VI (1378–1389), Bartolommeo Prignano, was once Archbishop of Acerenza, though his work was in Avignon, where he was an Auditor in the papal chancellery.

=== Cathedrals ===
The cathedral in Acerenza, begun around 1080 by Archbishop Arnaldus (1066–1101), is dedicated to Saint Canius (or Canio or Cano), whose alleged remains were found at Atella by Bishop Leo, c. 799, and brought to Acerenza. The cathedral of Matera is dedicated to Saint Eucherius.

Acerenza is known for a bust which has long been supposed to be that of Saint Canius, patron of the city, to whom the cathedral is dedicated, but which is believed to be a portrait-bust of Julian the Apostate, though others express doubt, some even maintain that it is a bust of the Emperor Frederick II, after the manner of the sculptors of the Antonine age.

The cathedral Chapter of Matera was composed, in 1703, of three dignities and twenty-four canons. Acerenza had two dignities and ten canons. In the mid-19th century, the cathedral had a Chapter composed of six dignities (the Archdeacon, the Cantor, the Treasurer, the Archpriest, and the Theologus and the Penitentiary), and twenty canons.

The archbishops preferred to live in the much larger town of Matera, except in the summer months. The population of Acerenza, in 1703 was c. 2,000, that of Matera 15,000. The archbishop's Vicar-general resided at Acerenza, and handled the legal business of the archdiocese, as well as cases on appeal from the suffragan dioceses.

=== Kingdom of the Two Sicilies ===
Following the extinction of the Napoleonic Kingdom of Italy and the removal of King Joachim Marat, the Congress of Vienna authorized the restoration of the Papal States and the Kingdom of Naples. Since the French occupation had seen the abolition of many Church institutions in the kingdom, as well as the confiscation of most Church property and resources, it was imperative that Pope Pius VII and Ferdinand I of the Two Sicilies (King Ferdinand IV) reach agreement on restoration and restitution.

A concordat was finally signed on 16 February 1818, and ratified by Pius VII on 25 February 1818. Ferdinand issued the concordat as a law on 21 March 1818. The re-erection of the dioceses of the kingdom and the ecclesiastical provinces took more than three years. The right of the king to nominate the candidate for a vacant bishopric was recognized, as in the Concordat of 1741, subject to papal confirmation (preconisation). This was confirmed by the papal Indult "Sinceritas Fidei" of 7 March 1818.

In the enabling papal legislation, the bull "De Utiliori" of 27 July 1818, Pius VII assigned as suffragans of the archdiocese of Acerenza the dioceses of Anglona and Tursi (united), Potenza, Tricarico, and Venosa. The diocesee of Matera, previously united to Acerenza, was added to Acerenza in perpetuo.

On 5 August 1910, the archbishops of Acerenza & Materano were granted the additional title of abbot of S. Angelo di Montescaglioso.

On 2 July 1954, the archdioceses of Acherenza and Matera were separated, each receiving its own archbishop. The title of Abbot of S. Angelo di Montecaglioso was assigned to the archbishops of Matera.

=== Metropolinate removed ===
Following the Second Vatican Council, and in accordance with the norms laid out in the council's decree, Christus Dominus chapter 40, Pope Paul VI undertook the reorganization of the ecclesiastical provinces and dioceses of Lucania. On 21 August 1976, he issued the bull "Quo aptius" to create the new ecclesiastical province of Potenza, which involved the removal of metropolitan status of both Acerenza and Matera. Both became suffragan dioceses in the ecclesiastical province of Potenza, along with their former suffragan dioceses, though the archbishops retained their titles.

== List of bishops/archbishops ==
=== Bishops of Acerenza ===
The fifteen names and terms of the bishops, down to 'Joseph', are traditional and undocumented.

- Romanus (300–329)
- Monocollus (for 8 years)
- Petrus I (for 3 years)
- Sylvius (for 5 years)
- Theodosius (for 8 years)
- Aloris (for 22 years)
- Stephanus Primus (for 2 years)
- Araldus (for 4 years)
- Bertus (for 3 years)
- Leo (I) (for 23 years)
- Lupus (for 3 years)
- Evalanius (for 12 years)
- Azo (for 3 years)
- Asedeus (for 8 years)
- Joseph (for 23 years)

...

- Justus of Acerenza (occurs 499)

...

- Leo (II) (occurs 799)
- Peter (II) (833)
- Rudolf (869–874)
- Leo (III) (874–904)
- Andrea (906–935)
- Johannes (I) (936–972)
- Johannes (II) (993–996)
- Stephanus II (996–1024)

=== Bishops or Archbishops of Acerenza ===
- At some point during the 11th century, before 1063, the diocese was elevated to the rank of an archdiocese

- Stephan III (1029–1041)
- Stephan IV (1041–1048)
- Goderio I (1048–1058)
- Goderio II (1058–1059)

=== Archbishops of Acerenza ===
- Godano or Gelardo (1059–1066)
- Arnald (1066–1101)
- Peter (III) (1102–1142)
- Durando (1142–1151)
- Robert (I) (1151–1178)
- Richardus (1178–1184)
- Peter (IV) (1184–1194)
- Peter (V) (1194–1197)
- Rainaldo (1198–1199)
- Andrea (1200–1231)

=== Archbishops of Acerenza and Matera ===
From 1203 to 1954 the archbishopric of Acerenza was joined to that of the diocese of Matera aeque principaliter.

==== from 1200 to 1600 ====
- Andrea (1200–1231 and 1236–1246)
- Anselm (1253–1267)
- Laurentius, O.P. (1268–1276)
- Pietro d'Archia (1277–1299)

○ Gentile Orsini, O.P., Apostolic Administrator (1300–1303)

○ Guido (or Guglielmo), O.Cist., Apostolic Administrator (1303–1306)

- Landolfo (or Rudolfo) (1306–1308)
- Robert II (1308–1334)
- Pietro VII (1334–1343)
- Giovanni Corcello (1343–1363)
- Bartolomeo Prignano (1363–1377)
- Niccolò Acconciamuro (1377–1378)
- Giacomo di Silvestro (1379), Roman Obedience
- Giovanni (1379–1384?), Avignon Obedience
- Bisanzio Morelli (1380–1391), Avignon Obedience
- Pietro Giovanni de Baraballis, O.Min. (1392–1394), Roman Obedience
- Stefano Goberio (1395–1402), Roman Obedience
- Riccardo de Olibano (1402–1407), Roman Obedience
- Niccolò Piscicello, O.P. (1407–1414), Roman Obedience
- Manfredi Aversano (1415–1444), Pisan-Roman Obedience
- Marino de Paolis (1444–1470)
- Francesco Enrico Lunguardo (1471–1482)
- Vincenzo Palmieri (1483–1518)
- Andrea Matteo Palmieri (1518–1528)
- Luigi de Palmieri, O.F.M. (1528–1530)

○ Andrea Matteo Palmieri, Apostolic Administrator (1530–1531)

- Giovanni Michele Saraceni (1531–1556)
- Sigismondo Saraceno (1558–1585)
- Francesco Antonio Santorio (1586–1588)
- Francisco Avellaneda (1591)
- Scipione de Tolfa (1593–1595)
- Giovanni Myra (1596–1600)

==== From 1600 to 1954 ====
Sede vacante (1600–1605)

- Giuseppe de Rossi (1605–1610)
- Giovanni Spilla, O.P. (Juan de Espila) (1611–1619)
- Fabrizio Antinori (1621–1630)
- Giandomenico Spinola (1630–1632)
- Simone Carafa Roccella, C.R. (1638–1647)
- Giambattista Spinola (1648–1664)
- Vincenzo Lanfranchi (1665–1676)
- Antonio del Río Colmenares (1678–1702)
- Antonio Maria Brancaccio, C.R. (1703–1722)
- Giuseppe Maria Positano, O.P. (1723–1729)
- Alfonso Miraconda, O.S.B. (1730–1737)
- Giovanni Rossi, C.R. (1737–1738)
- Francesco Lanfreschi, C.R. (1738–1754)
- Antonio Ludovico Antinori, Cong.Orat. (1754–1758)
- Serafino Filangeri, O.S.B. (1759–1762)
- Nicola Filomarini, O.S.B. (1763–1768)
- Carlo Parlati (1767–1774)
- Giuseppe Sparano (1775–1776)
- Francesco Zunica (1776–1796)
- Camillo Cattaneo della Volta (1797–1834)
- Antonio Di Macco (1835–1854)
- Gaetano Rossini (1855–1867)
- Pietro Giovine (1871–1879)
- Gesualdo Nicola Loschirico, O.F.M. Cap. (1880–1890)
- Francesco Maria Imparati, O.F.M. (1890–1892)
- Raffaele di Nonno, C.Ss.R. (1893–1895)
- Diomede Angelo Raffaele Gennaro Falconio, O.F.M. (1895–1899)
- Raffaele Rossi (1900–1906)
- Anselmo Filippo Pecci, O.S.B. (1907–1945)
- Vincenzo Cavalla (1946–1954)

=== Archbishops of Acerenza ===
Acerenza and Matera were separated again into two archdioceses on 2 July 1954

- Domenico Pecchinenna (1954–1961)
- Corrado Ursi (1961–1966)
- Giuseppe Vairo (1966–1979)
- Francesco Cuccarese (1979–1987)
- Michele Scandiffio (1988–2005)
- Giovanni Ricchiuti (2005–2016)
- Francesco Sirufo (20 May 2016–present)

== Bibliography ==
=== Reference works for bishops ===
- Gams, Pius Bonifatius (1873). Series episcoporum Ecclesiae catholicae: quotquot innotuerunt a beato Petro apostolo (in Latin). Ratisbon: Typis et Sumptibus Georgii Josephi Manz. pp. 843–844.
- Eubel, Conradus, ed. (1913). Hierarchia catholica (in Latin). Vol. Tomus 1 (second ed.). Münster: Libreria Regensbergiana. (in Latin)
- Eubel, Conradus, ed. (1914). Hierarchia catholica (in Latin). Vol. Tomus 2 (second ed.). Münster: Libreria Regensbergiana.
- Gulik, Guilelmus (1923). Eubel, Conradus (ed.). Hierarchia catholica (in Latin). Vol. Tomus 3 (second ed.). Münster: Libreria Regensbergiana.
- Gauchat, Patritius (Patrice) (1935). Hierarchia catholica. Vol. Tomus IV (1592-1667). Münster: Libraria Regensbergiana.
- Ritzler, Remigius; Sefrin, Pirminus (1952). Hierarchia catholica medii et recentis aevi. Vol. Tomus V (1667-1730). Patavii: Messagero di S. Antonio.
- Ritzler, Remigius; Sefrin, Pirminus (1958). Hierarchia catholica medii et recentis aevi. Vol. Tomus VI (1730-1799). Patavii: Messagero di S. Antonio.
- Ritzler, Remigius; Sefrin, Pirminus (1968). Hierarchia Catholica medii et recentioris aevi (in Latin). Vol. VII (1800–1846). Monasterii: Libreria Regensburgiana.
- Remigius Ritzler; Pirminus Sefrin (1978). Hierarchia catholica Medii et recentioris aevi (in Latin). Vol. VIII (1846–1903). Il Messaggero di S. Antonio.
- Pięta, Zenon (2002). Hierarchia catholica medii et recentioris aevi (in Latin). Vol. IX (1903–1922). Padua: Messagero di San Antonio. ISBN 978-88-250-1000-8.

=== Studies ===
- Belli D' Elia, P. & Gelao C. (1999). La cattedrale di Acerenza. Mille anni di storia. Venosa 1999.
- Cappelletti, Giuseppe (1870). Le chiese d'Italia: dalla loro origine sino ai nostri giorni (in Italian). Vol. vigesimo (20). Venezia: G. Antonelli. pp. 417–452.
- D'Avino, Vincenzio (1848). Cenni storici sulle chiese arcivescovili, vescovili, e prelatizie (nullius) del regno delle due Sicilie (in Italian). Naples: dalle stampe di Ranucci. pp. 5–6. [text by Francesco Saverio Girardi]
- Kehr, Paulus Fridolin (1962). Italia pontificia. Regesta pontificum Romanorum. Vol. IX: Samnia – Apulia – Lucania. (in Latin) Berlin: Weidmann. pp. 452–467.
- Lettini, Giuseppe (2001). Acerenza e i suoi vescovi. (in Italian). Acerenza: Curia Arcivescovile Acerenza. 2001.
- Loud, G.A. (2007). The Latin Church in Norman Italy. Cambridge: CUP 2007.
- Minasi, Giovanni (1896). Le chiese di Calabria dal quinto al duodecimo secolo: cenni storici. Napoli: Lanciano e Pinto 1896.
- Ughelli, Ferdinando; Coleti, NIccolo (1721). Italia sacra sive De episcopis Italiæ, et insularum adjacentium (in Latin). Vol. Tomus septimus (7). Venice: apud Sebastianum Coleti. pp. 5–67.
