= Cusano =

Cusano may refer to:

- Biagio Cusano (died 1683), poet and law professor
- Cusano Milanino, in the Province of Milan, Lombardy
- Cusano Mutri, in the Province of Benevento, Campania
- Università degli Studi Niccolò Cusano, university
- William Cusano (1943–2012), Canadian politician

== See also ==
- Vinnie Vincent (born Vincent John Cusano, 1952), guitarist and songwriter
