= Giovanni Myra =

Roman Catholic prelate (died 1600)

Most Reverend Giovanni Myra
- Archbishop of Acerenza e Matera
- Church: Catholic Church
- Archdiocese: Archdiocese of Acerenza
- In office: 1596–1600
- Predecessor: Scipione de Tolfa
- Successor: Giuseppe de Rossi (archbishop)

Personal details
- Died: 1600

Giovanni Myra or Giovanni Mira (died 1600) was a Roman Catholic prelate who served as Archbishop of Acerenza e Matera (1596–1600) and Bishop of Castellammare di Stabia (1591–1596).

== Biography ==
On 13 September 1591, Giovanni Myra was appointed during the papacy of Pope Gregory XIV as Bishop of Castellammare di Stabia. On 11 March 1596, he was appointed during the papacy of Pope Clement VIII as Archbishop of Acerenza e Matera. He served as Archbishop of Acerenza e Matera until his death in 1600.

== External links and additional sources ==
- Cheney, David M. "Diocese of Castellammare di Stabia". Catholic-Hierarchy.org. (for Chronology of Bishops) ^{[self-published]}
- Chow, Gabriel. "Diocese of Castellammare di Stabia (Italy)". GCatholic.org. (for Chronology of Bishops) ^{[self-published]}
- Cheney, David M. "Archdiocese of Acerenza". Catholic-Hierarchy.org. (for Chronology of Bishops) ^{[self-published]}
- Chow, Gabriel. "Archdiocese of Acerenza (Italy)". GCatholic.org. (for Chronology of Bishops ^{[self-published]}

Catholic Church titles
Preceded by Ludovico Majorino	Bishop of Castellammare di Stabia; 1591–1596	Succeeded by Vittorino Mansi
Preceded by Scipione de Tolfa	Archbishop of Acerenza e Matera; 1596–1600	Succeeded by Giuseppe de Rossi (archbishop)
