= Sigismondo Saraceno =

Roman Catholic prelate (died 1585)

Most Reverend Sigismondo Saraceno
- Archbishop of Acerenza e Matera
- Church: Catholic Church
- Archdiocese: Archdiocese of Acerenza e Matera
- In office: 1556–1585
- Predecessor: Giovanni Michele Saraceni
- Successor: Francesco Antonio Santorio

Orders
- Consecration: 14 September 1556 by Giovanni Michele Saraceni

Personal details
- Died: 7 January 1585

Sigismondo Saraceno (died 7 January 1585) was an Italian Roman Catholic prelate who served as Archbishop of Acerenza e Matera (1556–1585).

== Biography ==
On 4 May 1556, Sigismondo Saraceno was appointed during the papacy of Pope Paul IV as Archbishop of Acerenza e Matera. On 14 September 1556, he was consecrated bishop by Giovanni Michele Saraceni, Cardinal-Priest of Santa Maria in Ara Coeli, with Giovanni Beraldo, Bishop of Telese o Cerreto Sannita, and Nicola Majorano (Maggiorani), Bishop of Molfetta, serving as co-consecrators. He served as Archbishop of Acerenza e Matera until his death on 7 January 1585.

== External links and additional sources ==
- Cheney, David M. "Archdiocese of Acerenza". Catholic-Hierarchy.org. (for Chronology of Bishops) ^{[self-published]}
- Chow, Gabriel. "Archdiocese of Acerenza (Italy)". GCatholic.org. (for Chronology of Bishops ^{[self-published]}

Catholic Church titles
Preceded by Giovanni Michele Saraceni	Archbishop of Acerenza e Matera; 1556–1585	Succeeded by Francesco Antonio Santorio
