= Francesco Antonio Santorio =

Roman Catholic prelate

The Most Reverend Francesco Antonio Santorio
- Archbishop of Acerenza e Matera
- Church: Catholic Church
- Archdiocese: Archdiocese of Acerenza e Matera
- In office: 1586–1589
- Predecessor: Sigismondo Saraceno
- Successor: Francisco Avellaneda
- Previous post: Archbishop of Santa Severina (1573-1586)

Orders
- Consecration: March 1573 by Giulio Antonio Santorio

Personal details
- Died: 1589

Francesco Antonio Santorio (died 1589) was a Roman Catholic prelate who served as Archbishop of Acerenza e Matera (1586–1589) and Archbishop of Santa Severina (1573–1586).

== Biography ==
On 9 January 1573, Francesco Antonio Santorio was appointed during the papacy of Pope Gregory XIII as Archbishop of Santa Severina. In March 1573, he was consecrated bishop by Giulio Antonio Santorio, Cardinal-Priest of San Bartolomeo all'Isola. On 28 July 1586, he was appointed during the papacy of Pope Sixtus V as Archbishop of Acerenza e Matera. He served as Archbishop of Acerenza e Matera until his death in 1589.

== External links and additional sources ==
- Cheney, David M. "Archbishop Muzio Soriano". Catholic-Hierarchy.org. (for Chronology of Bishops) ^{[self-published]}
- Chow, Gabriel. "Archdiocese of Santa Severina (Italy)". GCatholic.org. (for Chronology of Bishops) ^{[self-published]}
- Cheney, David M. "Archdiocese of Acerenza". Catholic-Hierarchy.org. (for Chronology of Bishops) ^{[self-published]}
- Chow, Gabriel. "Archdiocese of Acerenza (Italy)". GCatholic.org. (for Chronology of Bishops ^{[self-published]}

Catholic Church titles
| Preceded by Giulio Antonio Santorio | Archbishop of Santa Severina; 1573–1586 | Succeeded by Alfonso Pisani |
| Preceded by Sigismondo Saraceno | Archbishop of Acerenza e Matera; 1586–1589 | Succeeded by Francisco Avellaneda |
