= Roman Catholic Archdiocese of Matera =

Former Roman Catholic diocese in Italy

The Diocese of Matera (Latin: Archidioecesis Materanensis) was a Roman Catholic archdiocese located in the town of Matera in the Province of Matera in the region of Basilicata, in Southern Italy. In 1203, it was united with the Archdiocese of Acerenza to form the Archdiocese of Acerenza e Matera.

== See also ==
- Catholic Church in Italy
