= Giuseppe de Rossi (archbishop of Acerenza e Matera) =

Roman Catholic prelate

Most Reverend Giuseppe de Rossi
- Archbishop of Acerenza e Matera
- Church: Catholic Church
- Archdiocese: Archdiocese of Acerenza e Matera
- In office: 1605–1610
- Predecessor: Giovanni Myra
- Successor: Juan de Espila

Personal details
- Died: 5 February 1610

Giuseppe de Rossi (died 1610) was a Roman Catholic prelate who served as Archbishop of Acerenza e Matera (1605–1610), Bishop of L'Aquila (1599–1605), and Bishop of Ugento (1596–1599).

== Biography ==
On 11 March 1596, Giuseppe de Rossi was appointed during the papacy of Pope Clement VIII as Bishop of Ugento. On 29 March 1599, he was appointed during the papacy of Pope Clement VIII as Bishop of L'Aquila. On 12 September 1605, he was appointed during the papacy of Pope Paul V as Archbishop of Acerenza e Matera. He served as Archbishop of Acerenza e Matera until his death on 5 February 1610.

While bishop, he was the principal co-consecrator of Sebastiano Roberti, Bishop of Tricarico (1609).

== External links and additional sources ==
- Cheney, David M. "Diocese of Ugento–Santa Maria di Leuca". Catholic-Hierarchy.org. (for Chronology of Bishops) ^{[self-published]}
- Chow, Gabriel. "Diocese of Ugento–Santa Maria di Leuca (Italy)". GCatholic.org. (for Chronology of Bishops) ^{[self-published]}
- Cheney, David M. "Archdiocese of L'Aquila". Catholic-Hierarchy.org. (for Chronology of Bishops) ^{[self-published]}
- Chow, Gabriel. "Metropolitan Archdiocese of L'Aquila (Italy)". GCatholic.org. (for Chronology of Bishops) ^{[self-published]}
- Cheney, David M. "Archdiocese of Acerenza". Catholic-Hierarchy.org. (for Chronology of Bishops) ^{[self-published]}
- Chow, Gabriel. "Archdiocese of Acerenza (Italy)". GCatholic.org. (for Chronology of Bishops) ^{[self-published]}

Catholic Church titles
Preceded by Desiderio Mezzapica da S. Martino	Bishop of Ugento; 1596–1599	Succeeded by Pedro Guerrero (bishop)
Preceded by Basile Pignatelli	Bishop of L'Aquila; 1599–1605	Succeeded by Gonzalo de Rueda
Preceded by Giovanni Myra	Archbishop of Acerenza e Matera; 1605–1610	Succeeded by Juan de Espila
