= Michele Scandiffio =

Italian Roman Catholic prelate (1928–2022)

The Most Reverend Michele Scandiffio
- Archbishop Emeritus of Acerenza
- Diocese: Acerenza
- Appointed: 30 April 1988
- Term ended: 27 July 2005
- Predecessor: Francesco Cuccarese
- Successor: Giovanni Ricchiuti

Orders
- Ordination: 8 July 1951
- Consecration: 9 July 1988 by Michele Giordano

Personal details
- Born: 29 September 1928 Pomarico, Italy
- Died: 6 June 2022 (aged 93) Matera, Italy
- Motto: CARITAS CHRISTI URGET NOS
- Coat of arms

Styles of Michele Scandiffio
- Reference style: His Excellency; The Most Reverend
- Spoken style: Your Excellency
- Religious style: Archbishop

Michele Scandiffio (29 September 1928 – 6 June 2022) was an Italian Roman Catholic prelate.

Scandiffio was ordained to the priesthood in 1951. He served as the archbishop of the Roman Catholic Archdiocese of Acerenza, Italy from 1988 until his retirement in 2005.

Catholic Church titles
Preceded by Francesco Cuccarese	Archbishop of Acerenza; 1988–2005	Succeeded by Giovanni Ricchiuti
