= Scipione de Tolfa =

Italian Roman Catholic prelate (died 1595)

Most Reverend Francisco Avellaneda
- Archbishop of Acerenza e Matera
- Church: Catholic Church
- Archdiocese: Archdiocese of Acerenza e Matera
- In office: 1593–1595
- Predecessor: Francisco Avellaneda
- Successor: Giovanni Myra
- Previous post: Archbishop of Trani (1576–1593)

Personal details
- Died: 1595

Scipione de Tolfa (died 1595) was a Roman Catholic prelate who served as Archbishop of Acerenza e Matera (1593–1595) and Archbishop of Trani (1576–1593).

== Biography ==
On 10 December 1576, Scipione de Tolfa was appointed during the papacy of Pope Gregory XIII as Archbishop of Trani. On 20 December 1593, he was appointed during the papacy of Pope Clement VIII as Archbishop of Acerenza e Matera. He served as Archbishop of Acerenza e Matera until his death in 1595.

While bishop, he was the principal co-consecrator of José Esteve Juan, Bishop of Vieste (1586) and Benedetto Mandina, Bishop of Caserta.

== External links and additional sources ==
- Cheney, David M. "Archdiocese of Trani-Barletta-Bisceglie (-Nazareth)". Catholic-Hierarchy.org. (for Chronology of Bishops) ^{[self-published]}
- Chow, Gabriel. "Archdiocese of Trani-Barletta-Bisceglie (Italy)". GCatholic.org. (for Chronology of Bishops) ^{[self-published]}
- Cheney, David M. "Archdiocese of Acerenza". Catholic-Hierarchy.org. (for Chronology of Bishops) ^{[self-published]}
- Chow, Gabriel. "Archdiocese of Acerenza (Italy)". GCatholic.org. (for Chronology of Bishops ^{[self-published]}

Catholic Church titles
Preceded by Angelo Oraboni	Archbishop of Trani; 1576–1593	Succeeded by Giulio Caracciolo
Preceded by Francisco Avellaneda	Archbishop of Acerenza e Matera; 1593–1595	Succeeded by Giovanni Myra
