= Francisco Avellaneda (bishop) =

Roman Catholic prelate

Most Reverend Francisco Avellaneda
- Archbishop of Acerenza e Matera
- Church: Catholic Church
- Archdiocese: Archdiocese of Acerenza e Matera
- In office: 1591
- Predecessor: Francesco Antonio Santorio
- Successor: Scipione de Tolfa

Personal details
- Born: Spain
- Died: 3 October 1591

Francisco Avellaneda (Spanish: Francesco de Abillaneda) (died 3 October 1591) was a Roman Catholic prelate who served as Archbishop of Acerenza e Matera (1591).

== Biography ==
Francisco Avellaneda was born in Spain. On 30 January 1591, Francisco Avellaneda was appointed during the papacy of Pope Gregory XIV as Archbishop of Acerenza e Matera. He served as Archbishop of Acerenza e Matera until his death on 3 October 1591.

== See also ==
- Catholic Church in Italy

== External links and additional sources ==
- Cheney, David M. "Archdiocese of Acerenza". Catholic-Hierarchy.org. (for Chronology of Bishops) ^{[self-published]}
- Chow, Gabriel. "Archdiocese of Acerenza (Italy)". GCatholic.org. (for Chronology of Bishops ^{[self-published]}

Catholic Church titles
Preceded by Francesco Antonio Santorio	Archbishop of Acerenza e Matera; 1591	Succeeded by Scipione de Tolfa
