= Royal Society for the Promotion of the Natural Sciences of Naples =

19th century learned society in Naples, Italy

Coordinates: 40.848625°N 14.247050°E

Royal Society of Encouragement to Natural Sciences of Naples
- Regal Società d'Incoraggiamento alle Scienze Naturali di Napoli
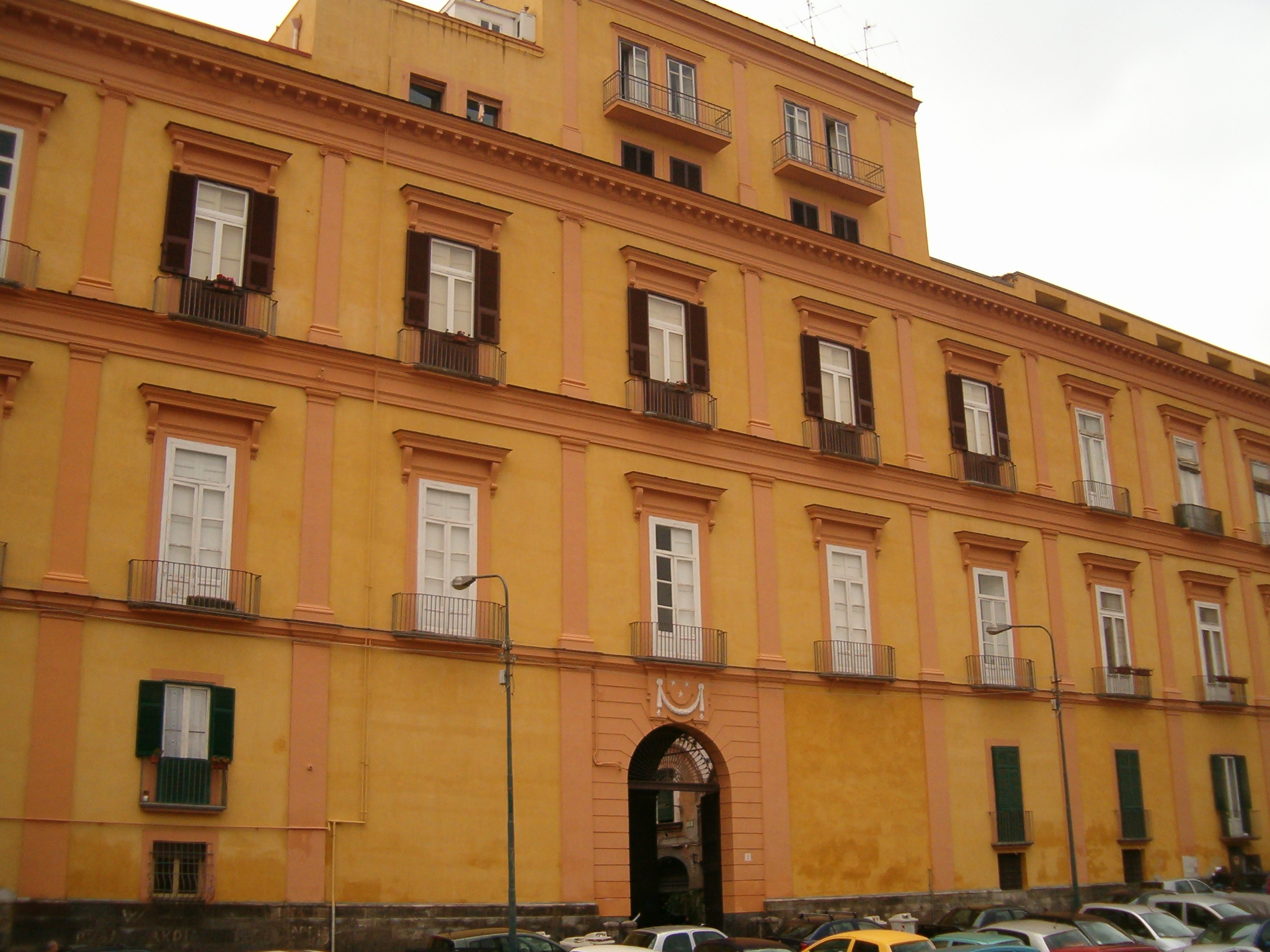
- Palace Spinelli di Tarsia, Naples the seat of the society all over the 19th century
- Formation: 1806; 220 years ago
- Founder: Joseph Napoleon
- Founded at: Naples, Italy
- Dissolved: c. 1937; 89 years ago
- Headquarters: Naples, Italy
- Location: Palace Spinelli di Tarsia, Naples
- Official language: Italian

The Royal Society of Encouragement to Natural Sciences of Naples (Italian: Regal Società d'Incoraggiamento alle Scienze Naturali di Napoli, Società d'Incoraggiamento per le Scienze e le Arti Utili or Reale Istituto d'Incoraggiamento di Napoli) was a 19th-century learned society, established in the Kingdom of Naples during the rule of king Joseph Napoleon at the beginning of the 19th century. Its activity, with different denominations, lasted until the first decades of the 20th century; it was officially closed in the 1930s, most likely in 1937. Its seat over the whole 19th century was Palace Spinelli di Tarsia, located in piazzetta Tarsia, Naples.

The society was established in Naples in 1806 by Joseph Bonaparte, during the Napoleonic rule, and it started in the same year as the decree abolishing feudalism in the Kingdom of Naples (Italian: leggi eversive della feudalità). It has been renamed a few times.

== Publications ==
The society had its own journal, published with the title Atti. In 1888-1893, Rendiconto started to be published too.

The latest journals were published with the title Atti del Reale Istituto d'Incoraggiamento di Napoli in the period from 1888 to 1937. 1937 is the year of the last issue published; therefore it can be concluded that the date of extinction of the society must be around 1937.

== See also ==
- Kingdom of Naples
- Luca de Samuele Cagnazzi
- Vitangelo Bisceglia
- University of Altamura

== Bibliography ==
- Francesco Di Battista, Origini e involuzione dell'Istituto d'Incoraggiamento di Napoli, in Associazionismo economico e diffusione dell'economia politica nell'Italia dell'Ottocento. Dalle società economico-agrarie alle associazioni di economisti, (curatori: Massimo M. Augello, Marco E. L. Guidi; collaboratori: Terenzio Maccabelli, Luca Michelini). Milano, FrancoAngeli, 2000, Vol.1, pp. 261–274
- "Storia dell'I.T.G. Gian Battista della Porta".
- Statuto e regolamento dopo il riordino del 1887, from Atti Del Reale Istituto D'Incoraggiamento Di Napoli, Volume 1, BiblioBazaar, 2009 ISBN 1-110-18176-0 (pp. 17 e segg. - limited preview on Google Books)
