= Vincenzo Petagna =

Italian biologist, physician and entomologist

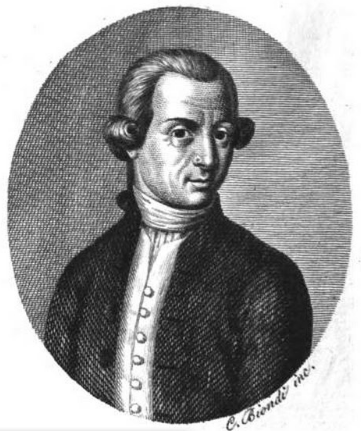
- Vincenzo Petagna
- Born: 17 January 1734; Naples, Kingdom of Naples
- Died: 6 October 1810 (aged 76) probably Naples
- Occupations: botanist, agronomist, professor

Vincenzo Petagna (17 January 1734 – 6 October 1810) was an Italian biologist, physician and entomologist. He was appointed as director of the small botanical garden pertaining to the Monastery of Santa Maria di Monte Oliveto (associated with the church now known as Sant'Anna dei Lombardi) in central Naples. He was also the teacher of Antonio Savaresi. The plant Petagnaea gussonei has been named after him.

== Life ==
Vincenzo Petagna was born in Naples on 17 January 1734; his father was Antonino Petagna, while his mother was Orsola Cuomo; his parents were described as "honest and fearful parents". As a boy, he first studied at the Jesuits, where he learned Latin. He later also studied philosophy and medicine and graduated in medicine at about the age of 20. Later, animated by interest in medicine, he followed a course of medicina-pratica taught by Luigi Visone.

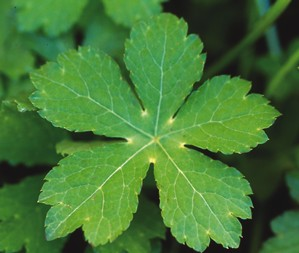
Petagnaea gussonei

In 1770, after he met the prince of Kaunitz, minister plenipotentiary of the court of Vienna in Naples, he traveled with him in Austria and he took the opportunity to visit also Germany and Western Italy. The trip allowed him to come into contact with important scholars from other countries and this, unlike other scholars of the Kingdom of Naples, granted him a greater notoriety abroad.

Back in Naples, he began to prepare his private collection of natural history, especially the section on insects. Then he had to go to Palermo in order to visit Marquis President Airoldi, and, once there, he took the chance to study Sicilian vegetation. Once back, he was assigned to teach botany at the Royal University of Naples, becoming professore interinale. Later, the position was confirmed, and he became a tenured professor. In his role as a professor, he was known for his kindness and courtesy towards students, and he managed successfully to teach them the properties of medicinal herbs.

In the preface of his work - Institutiones Botanicae - Petagna stated that he had learnt a lot inside the botanical garden of Pietro Sanseverino (a nobleman of Chiaromonte), and that he had been assisted by his talented assistant Giulio Candida.

He was a member of the Royal Institute of Encouragement to Natural Sciences of Naples and of many other academies. He was also a member of the Real Deputation of Health.

His only wish, according to the sources, was to have a sufficiently large botanical garden, but he was barely allowed to have a small one in the center of the previous Monastery of Monteoliveto, Naples . He died on 6 October 1810, perhaps in Naples. According to the sources, he was also a devoted Catholic.

== Works ==
- Vincenzo Petagna (1785). Institutiones botanicae - Tomus I - De philosophica botanica (in Latin). Porcelli.
- Vincenzo Petagna (1787). Specimen insectorum ulterioris Calabriae (in Latin). Varrentrapp et Venner.
- Vincenzo Petagna (1792). Institutiones entomologicae (in Latin). Gaetano Raimondi.
- Vincenzo Petagna (1796). Delle facultà delle piante (in Italian). Gaetano Raimondi.
- Vitangelo Bisceglia; Vincenzo Petagna. Alla scoperta delle cause che procurano il tetano e il torcimento di collo delle pecore.

=== Works by Petagna's pupil Giulio Candida ===
- Lettera di Giulio Candida al signor Vincenzo Petagna - Sulla formazione del molibdeno (in Italian). Naples: Giuseppe Maria Porcelli. 1785.

== Bibliography ==
- AA.VV. (1822). Biografia degli uomini illustri del regno di Napoli, ornata de'loro rispettivi ritratti compilata da diversi letterati nazionali. Vol. 8. Nicola Gervasi.
- AA.VV. (1822). Biografia degli uomini illustri del regno di Napoli, ornata de'loro rispettivi ritratti compilata da diversi letterati nazionali. Vol. 9. Nicola Gervasi.
- Atti del R. Istituto d'incoraggiamento alle scienze naturali di Napoli. Vol. II. Naples: Royal Society of Encouragement to Natural Sciences of Naples. 1818.
