= Andrea Matteo Palmieri =

Italian bishop and cardinal

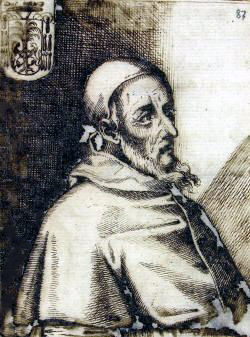
Portrait of Cardinal Palmieri

Andrea Matteo Palmieri (1493–1537) was an Italian Roman Catholic bishop and cardinal.

== Biography ==
Andrea Matteo Palmieri was born in Naples on 10 August 1493. He was a cleric in Naples before being elected Archbishop of Acerenza and Matera on 30 July 1518, with dispensation for not yet having reached the canonical age of 27.

During the pontificate of Pope Adrian VI, he spent his own money and solicited funds from his friends in the Knights Hospitaller to prepare troops to fight against the Ottoman Empire. However, after the fall of Rhodes (1522), this plan had to be abandoned.

Pope Clement VII made him a cardinal priest in the consistory of 21 November 1527. He received the red hat and the titular church of San Clemente at that time.

On 21 August 1528, he resigned the administration of Averenza and Matera in favour of his brother Francesco Palmieri. He was the administrator of the see of Sarno from 24 May 1529 until 24 August 1530. From 9 January 1534 to 8 January 1535 he was Camerlengo of the Sacred College of Cardinals. He was administrator of the see of Lucera from 20 August 1534 until 26 February 1535.

He participated in the papal conclave of 1534 that elected Pope Paul III.

From 15 to 16 July 1535, he was administrator of the see of Conza. He was administrator of the see of Policastro from 5 July 1535 until his death. Shortly before the cardinal's death, Charles V, Holy Roman Emperor named him governor of Milan.

He died in Rome on 20 January 1537. He is buried in Santa Maria del Popolo.
