= Biagio Cusano =

Italian Marinist poet and professor of law

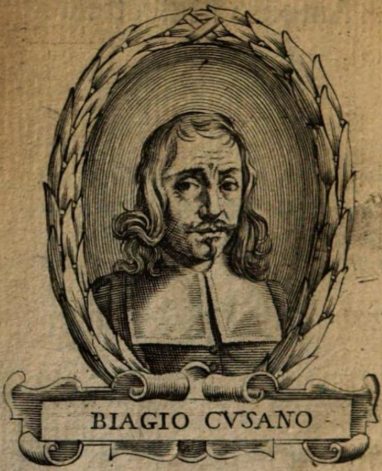
- Engraved portrait of Biagio Cusano, 1667
- Born: c. 1603; Vitulano, Kingdom of Naples
- Died: January 11, 1683; Naples, Kingdom of Naples
- Education: University of Naples Federico II
- Occupations: Poet; University teacher
- Employer: University of Naples Federico II
- Writing career
- Language: Latin; Italian
- Period: 17th century; Baroque
- Genres: Poetry; treatise
- Literary movement: Baroque; Marinism

Biagio Cusano (Vitulano, 1603 - Naples, 11 January 1683) was an Italian Marinist poet and professor of law. The exact date of birth is unknown; the year was derived from the death register. He is best known for being Gennaro Cusano's uncle and Marcello Papiniano Cusani's grand uncle.

== Biography ==
Born in Vitulano, in Principato Ultra, Kingdom of Naples, and graduated in law at the Royal University of Naples in 1631. Cusano became professor of canon law, Cattedra primaria de' Canoni della mattina, after Giuseppe Pulcarelli was promoted to Giulio Capone's position in 1673 (right after Giulio Capone's death). He apparently died of apoplexy (stroke) in 1683. He wrote many works, both published and unpublished. He married Susanna Sauchella, born around 1625. Their daughter Angela Ursula was baptized in Vitulano on March 15, 1652, and their son Giovanni Antonio Gennaro Gaetano on November 14, 1655. Their son Pietro Antonio Placido Bruno was baptized in Naples on October 6, 1667. Susanna died in Naples on January 1, 1675, and Biagio on January 11, 1683.

== Works ==
- Biagio Cusano (1636). L'Armonia. Napoli: Ottavio Beltrano.
- Biagio Cusano (1661). De' caratteri d'heroi. Napoli: Eredi di Ruberto Mollo.
- Biagio Cusano (1665). I dolori consolati della Sirena, che contengono l'universal cordoglio di Napoli, e del Regno per la morte del cattolico Filippo IV, e La consolazione universale per l'incoronazione del degnissimo figliuolo Carlo II. Napoli: Francesco Pace.
- Biagio Cusano (1672). Poesie sagre. Napoli: Giacinto Passaro.
- De Evictionibus.

== See also ==
- Marcello Papiniano Cusani

== Bibliography ==
- Contarino, Rosario (1985). "CUSANO, Biagio". Dizionario Biografico degli Italiani (in Italian). Vol. 31: Cristaldi–Dalla Nave. Rome: Istituto dell'Enciclopedia Italiana. ISBN 978-88-12-00032-6.
- Gisondi, Antonio (1985). "CUSANI, Marcello Papiniano". Dizionario Biografico degli Italiani (in Italian). Vol. 31: Cristaldi–Dalla Nave. Rome: Istituto dell'Enciclopedia Italiana. ISBN 978-88-12-00032-6.
- Origlia, Giangiuseppe (1754). Istoria dello studio di Napoli. Vol. 2. Torino: Giovanni Di Simone.
- Toppi, Niccolò (1678). Biblioteca napoletana, dalle origini per tutto l'anno 1678. Napoli: Antonio Bulifon.
- Napoli Signorelli, Pietro (1786). Vicende della coltura nelle Due Sicilie. Vol. 5. Napoli: Vincenzo Flauto.
- Irene Del Bagno (1993). Legum doctores. La formazione del ceto giuridico a Napoli tra Cinque e Seicento. Napoli: Jovene. p. 309.
- Vincenzo-Palmisciano-Sonia Benedetto (2024). Un amore segreto alla corte vicereale di Napoli, nelle opere di don Giuseppe Storace d'Afflitto. Napoli: KDP. pp. 24–25, 48, 59, 125, 213, 293, 384, 414, 418, 521, 600.
