= Giovanni Ricchiuti =

Italian archbishop (born 1948)

- Province: Bari, Italy
- Diocese: Diocese of Altamura-Gravina-Acquaviva delle Fonti
- Installed: 15 October 2013

Orders
- Ordination: 9 September 1972 by archbishop Giuseppe Carata

Personal details
- Born: August 1, 1948 (age 78) Bisceglie. Italy
- Denomination: Catholicism
- Motto: Misericordia et veritas iustitia et pax
- Coat of arms

Giovanni Ricchiuti is an Italian archbishop of the Catholic church. On 15 October, 2013 he's been appointed archbishop of the diocese of Altamura-Gravina-Acquaviva delle Fonti.

== Life ==
Giovanni Ricchiuti was born on 1 August 1948 in Bisceglie, in the Province of Barletta-Andria-Trani. He studied at the middle school of the seminary of Bisceglie and he attended the high school and seminaries in Molfetta. On 9 September 1972, he was ordained as presbyter by archbishop Giuseppe Carata. After the ordainment, he continued to study inside the Pontificio Istituto Biblico, Rome.

From 1975 to 1976, he was vice-rector of the Minor Seminary and then he was appointed parochial vicar of the parrocchia della Misericordia, in Bisceglie, where he stayed until 1979; in 1980, he was appointed parish priest, while in February 1994, he left the parish after being appointed rector of the seminary Pontificio Seminario Regionale Pugliese Pio XI, located in Molfetta.

On 27 July 2005, Pope Benedict XVI appointed him as archbishop of Acerenza; he succeeded Michele Scandiffio, who had resigned due to his age. On 8 October, he received episcopal ordination in Basilica di San Giuseppe (Bisceglie), by the archbishop Francesco Monterisi (then cardinal). On 15 October, he took possession of the archdiocese of Acerenza.

On 15 October 2013, Pope Francis nominated him bishop, with the title ad personam of archbishop of the diocese of Altamura-Gravina-Acquaviva delle Fonti; he succeeded Mario Paciello. On 4 January 2014, he took possession of the diocese.

On 23 April 2017, he inaugurated the diocesan family counseling, with the purpose of supporting families and their educational role. He is currently also a member of the Episcopal Commission for Social Problems and Work, Justice and Peace (Italian: Commissione episcopale per i problemi sociali e il lavoro, la giustizia e la pace) of the Episcopal Conference of Italy.

== Episcopal ministry ==
In October 2020, Mgr. Ricchiuti declared legalization of gay adoptions could be a good way to avoid the bearing surogacy. He was one of the first Italian bishops to publicly express a similar position.

He is also actively engaged in the anti-nuclearism and has expressed the Pax Christi's dislike with concerns to the Lockheed Martin F-35 Lightning II procurement.

== Positions held ==
- Archbishop-bishop of the diocese of Altamura-Gravina-Acquaviva delle Fonti
- Chairman of Pax Christi Italia
- Governor of the General Hospital Francesco Miulli, in Acquaviva delle Fonti, Bari (Italy)
- Chairman of the Commissione episcopale per la Famiglia e la Vita e per la Pastorale giovanile della Conferenza episcopale pugliese

=== Positions held in the past ===
- Rector of the seminary Pontificio seminario regionale pugliese Pio XI
- Archbishop of Acerenza

== Episcopal genealogy ==
- Cardinal Scipione Rebiba
- Cardinal Giulio Antonio Santori
- Cardinal Girolamo Bernerio, O.P.
- Archbishop Galeazzo Sanvitale
- Cardinal Ludovico Ludovisi
- Cardinal Luigi Caetani
- Cardinal Ulderico Carpegna
- Cardinal Paluzzo Paluzzi Altieri degli Albertoni
- Pope Benedict XIII
- Pope Benedict XIV
- Pope Clement XIII
- Cardinal Henry Benedict Stuart
- Pope Leo XII
- Cardinal Chiarissimo Falconieri Mellini
- Cardinal Camillo Di Pietro
- Cardinal Mieczysław Halka Ledóchowski
- Cardinal Jan Puzyna de Kosielsko
- Archbishop Józef Bilczewski
- Archbishop Bolesław Twardowski
- Archbishop Eugeniusz Baziak
- Pope John Paul II
- Cardinal Francesco Monterisi
- Archbishop Giovanni Ricchiuti

== Heraldry ==
Coat of arms

Blasonatura
The scroll of his coat of arms bears the motto: Misericordia et Veritas iustitia et pax , "Mercy and Truth are justice and peace".

The iconographic elements are inspired by the words of Psalm 84 (83), 11:

- a high mountain, in the center of the coat of arms, evokes the places where God revealed himself: the Sinai, the Tabor;
- the mountain is marked by a winding path that represents the path to conversion, and to sanctification (iustitia);
- on the calm sea an olive branch is placed, to symbolize the will of God to be reconciled with men, and therefore the "pax";
- along this itinerary men have Maria as their guide, represented by the eight-pointed star placed in the left canton.

== See also ==
- Diocese of Altamura-Gravina-Acquaviva delle Fonti
- Archdiocese of Acerenza
- Altamura Diocesan Museum Matroneum
