= University of Altamura =

Former university in Apulia, Kingdom of Naples

- Università degli Studi di Altamura
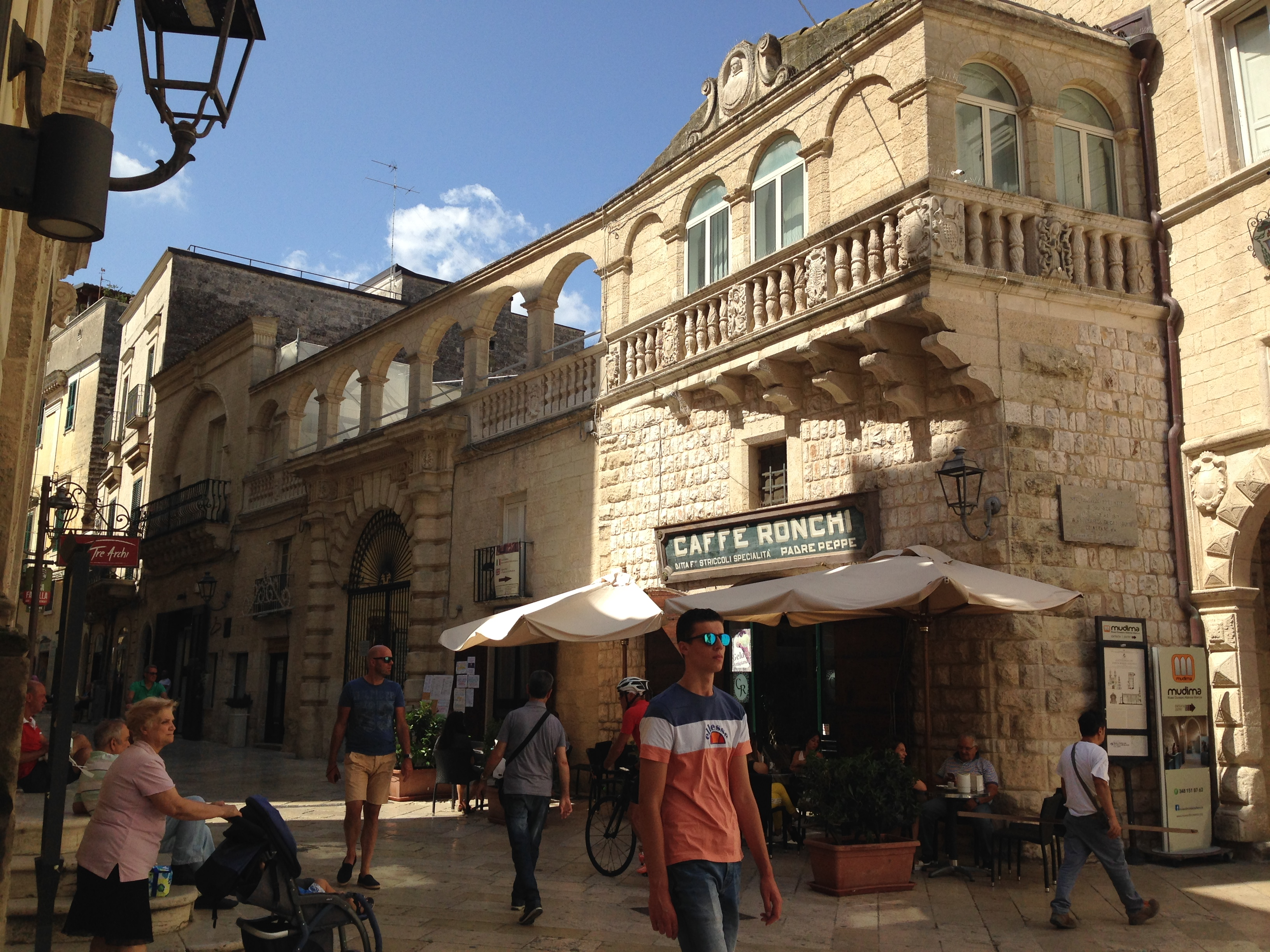
- The residence of the prelate (next to Altamura Cathedral), the location of the ancient University of Altamura
- Active: 1747–1812
- Founders: Marcello Papiniano Cusani; Charles III of Spain
- Rector: Gioacchino de Gemmis
- Location: Altamura, Apulia, Kingdom of Naples; 40.827120°N 16.552990°E
- Language: Italian

The University of Altamura (Italian: Università degli Studi di Altamura) was a former university located in Altamura, Apulia, Kingdom of Naples. It was established in Altamura in 1747 by Charles III of Bourbon, following the idea of the archpriest of Altamura Cathedral Marcello Papiniano Cusani. It was officially closed in 1812, mainly due to the lack of funds, even though some documents kept inside library Archivio capitolare in Altamura show that professors continued to teach until 1821.

Based on the statements of notable scholars, such as Bernardo Tanucci and Vitangelo Bisceglia, it can be concluded that the university had an excellent reputation at that time. Because of the university, Tanucci described Altamura as Appula Atene ("Apulia's Athens").

The subjects taught underwent considerable change over the history of the university. In total, the following subjects were taught: Law, ecclesiastical law, Latin, Ancient Greek, Hebrew, mathematics, geometry, physics, chemistry, botany, agronomy, mineralogy, medicine and theology.

The main sources about the history of the university are the documents stored in Altamura's libraries, mainly Archivio capitolare and Archivio Biblioteca Museo Civico (A.B.M.C.). The University of Altamura undoubtedly helped to spread scientific knowledge inside Altamura and the Kingdom of Naples. Prior to the founding of the university, there was very little or no interest at all in science.

== History ==
The University of Altamura was established in 1747 by the king Charles III of Spain. The idea was from the archpriest of Altamura Cathedral, Marcello Papiniano Cusani, who, a few months earlier, suggested using the money saved inside a fund called Monte a Moltiplicoin order to establish a university. The funds had already started to be collected as early as the XVII century but for a different purpose, i.e. converting Altamura Cathedral in a bishopric. It can be stated that, without Marcello Papiniano Cusani, there wouldn't have been any university in Altamura.

Moreover, Charles III liked the idea, since it was compatible with his reform policy, aimed at providing a secular education, by opening royal schools and universities.

Anyway, the funds of Monte a Moltiplico were insufficient to maintain a university, and, since the beginning, the rectors had to solve financial difficulties, which compromised the variety of the courses provided by the university. Cusani, determined, managed to finance the university with the offers from four religious institutions of the city (Italian: quattro luoghi Pii della città). The idea of a university in Altamura was well received by Altamurans, but most people thought that it would be a Jesuit seminary. Jesuits weren't in a good relationship with many ministers of the Kingdom of Naples; therefore, the initial idea of a Jesuit seminary was abandoned.

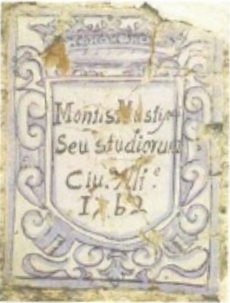
Plaque discovered in 1997 on a lintel of the first floor of the palace of the prelate, which was once the seat of the university (Latin: Montis M[ultiplic]i stipiu[m], seu studiorum civ[itatis] Alt[amurae, which means "Of the offers of Monte a Moltiplico, i.e. of the schools of the city of Altamura")

=== The Rectorship of Msgr. Gioacchino de Gemmis ===
In 1782, Gioacchino de Gemmis became archpriest and rector, and he managed to renovate the University of Altamura. De Gemmis wanted to reform the University of Altamura, by providing more scientific and technical courses.

Gioacchino de Gemmis was the author of a university reform program and he started courses of experimental physics, botany, mineralogy and it made it forbidden to write notes during the lessons. Previously, the students had to take notes during the lessons; in order to avoid distracting the students from the lessons because of the notes, it was decided that the teaching material should be printed instead. A library was also established which, over time, grew bigger thanks to the donations of de Gemmis himself and of private citizens. He also asked Vitangelo Bisceglia to come to teach botany to Altamura and to become his vicar.

Gioacchino de Gemmis promoted among teachers the habit of meeting in the evening in his living room to discuss teaching. Later on, those evening meetings were extended also to lawyers, doctors, nobles and traders of the city, and in his living room discussions also embraced economics, politics, philosophy and social themes.

=== Year 1799 ===
In 1799, the overthrow of the Bournons dynasty, the birth of the Parthenopean Republic, the so-called Altamuran Revolution and the return of the Bourbons after a few months halted the courses as well as any other activity of the university. Inside the city of Altamura, there was widespread fear. The harassment occurred on a daily basis, citizens "every day were stopped and spoiled". Many former professors of the university, such as Luca de Samuele Cagnazzi were accused of having joined the riots and they had to flee. Gioacchino de Gemmis also had to leave the city and he was replaced by rector Maffione di Bisceglie.

=== Closure ===
In 1806, with the new king Joseph Bonaparte, determined to end feudalism, Gioacchino de Gemmis was appointed again as rector of the University of Altamura, but the lack of funds still was a big issue. In the period 1809-1812, the number of students fell from 100 to 70 and in 1812 courses were officially closed, even though some documents stored in library Archivio capitolare of Altamura show that professors continued to teach until 1821.

=== After the closure ===
After the university was closed, somebody considered reopening it but, after the European Restoration and the return of the Bourbon dynasty, things became more complicated. In the 1840s, Luca de Samuele Cagnazzi and Gioacchiono Grimaldi discussed about this with the then mayor of Altamura and proposed using the funds of- Monte a Moltiplico in order to open a science laboratory (Italian: gabinetto di scienze). After their project was approved, both of them collected the instruments needed and in a short time they managed to create an experiment room for physics and mineralogy "gabinetto fisico mineralogico". The collection of instruments and devices comprised over 115 instruments. Even the experiment room risked being closed and, in 1865, it was given to a high school lyceum of Altamura, (Istituto Tecnico Ginnasiale) and since then it was used by the school as teaching materials. Today the collection belongs to the same high school, located in piazza Zanardelli, called liceo classico "Luca de Samuele Cagnazzi". Over the years, the collection grew bigger, while some old and worn out tools disappeared; nevertheless, the collection of ancient instruments is still big, various and rich.

In 2013, the classical lyceum of Altamura started an auction in order to sell 989 scientific instruments "broken, obsolete or unusable". A few local politicians expressed fears and contacted the principal of the high school. The principal explained that the scientific instruments being auctioned were modern and they had no historical value; he also added that the ancient instruments of the collection are and will always be "absolutely untouchable".

== The environment ==
The university started with courses focused on history and ancient languages, but soon it changed its inherent structure. Rector Gioacchino de Gemmis was the main promoter of the reformation of the university, and he wanted it to also incorporate scientific and technical subjects. Students educated in those disciplines could modernize agriculture and production systems of the region.

In the 1780s, a scientific circle of students and professors devoted to math and science (Italian: matematiche occupazioni) developed. Those took care of obtaining scientific books and keeping up-to-date. At that time, scientific subjects weren't much appreciated in the city and in the whole kingdom. In one of his writings, Luca de Samuele Cagnazzi recounted how hard it was for his Altamuran friend - Paolo Ruggeri - to study math, which was his favorite subject. Ruggeri's father was an Altamuran doctor who wanted his father to study theology. When Ruggeri came back to his hometown Altamura, he brought some math books with him, that his father confiscated, ordering him to devote himself to theology. But Ruggeri, breaking his father's orders, often went to the house of Luca de Samuele Cagnazzi and his brother in order to study, borrowed math books from them and went to the nearby countryside of Altamura in order to study. It also occurred that Ruggeri lost some books or that his father had them confiscated, asking a servant to give the books back to Cagnazzi and to not borrow them anymore. Rector Gioacchino de Gemmis esteemed him very much and asked him to become a math professor at the University of Altamura. He successfully taught for a few years, before becoming ill with pulmonary tuberculosis and dying very young.

== Professors ==
Many professors taught in the University of Altamura, and one of those was the founder of the university himself, Marcello Papiniano Cusani, who taught law and canon law (at that time those were called i due diritti, "the two legal frameworks").

=== Giuseppe Carlucci ===
One of the first and most notable professors of the university was Giuseppe Carlucci. In 1749, he was given the teaching of philosophy and geometry. He was Altamuran and he was described as a professor of "supreme justice, probity and humanity". Luca de Samuele Cagnazzi, in his autobiography, remembers him as an open-minded person, who "hated the superstition that was promoted by silly priests". He also studied mathematics and philosophy, and he was largely self-taught since at that time there was "little love for these sciences"

In order to show his scientific skills, he wrote a treatise in which he demonstrated the certainty of the Earth's motion, dismissing the beliefs and oppositions of that period. The work earned him the admiration of many scholars of that period. In particular, Msgr. Celestino Galiani greatly appreciated his treatise in a letter dated 30 November 1748.

I'm astonished that there are so skilled people in the provinces of this kingdom. Thus please give him the chair of philosophy and mathematics in those Royal Schools in accordance with His Majesty's Sovereign Intention.

— Msgr. Celestino Galiani

=== Luca de Samuele Cagnazzi ===
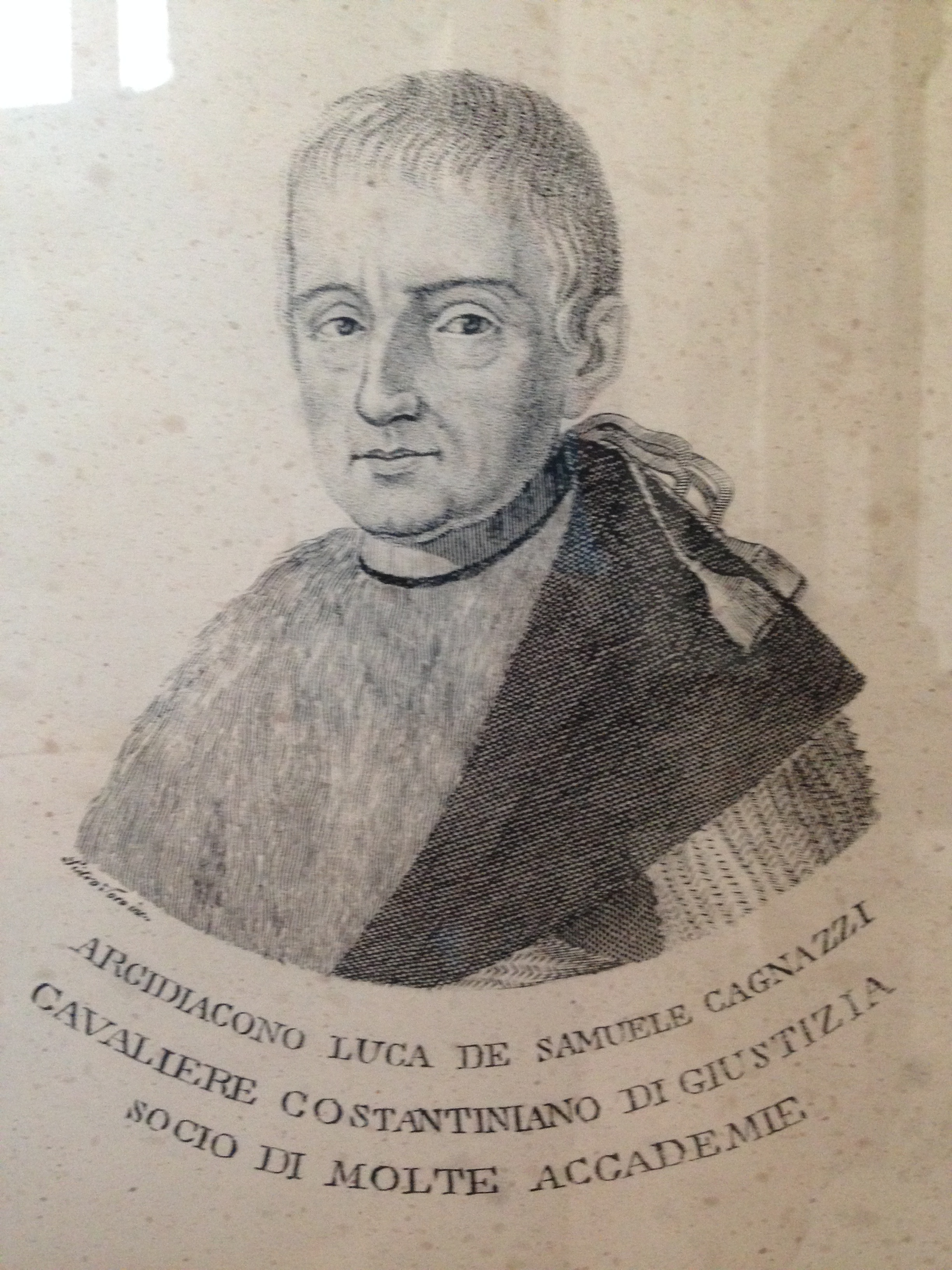
Painting of Luca de Samuele Cagnazzi, exhibited in library Archivio Biblioteca Museo Civico (A.B.M.C.), in piazza Zanardelli, Altamura

Another notable teacher was Luca de Samuele Cagnazzi, who was an ex-student of the same university selected to be the assistant of Professor Giuseppe Carlucci for the chair of philosophy and geometry. Following Carlucci's death, he took up his position.

The work of Cagnazzi was devoted to promoting scientific knowledge, which, at that time, was still at an early stage in the Kingdom of Naples. In particular, he provided the university library of scientific books and provided the students with scientific tools for experiments.

=== Vitangelo Bisceglia ===
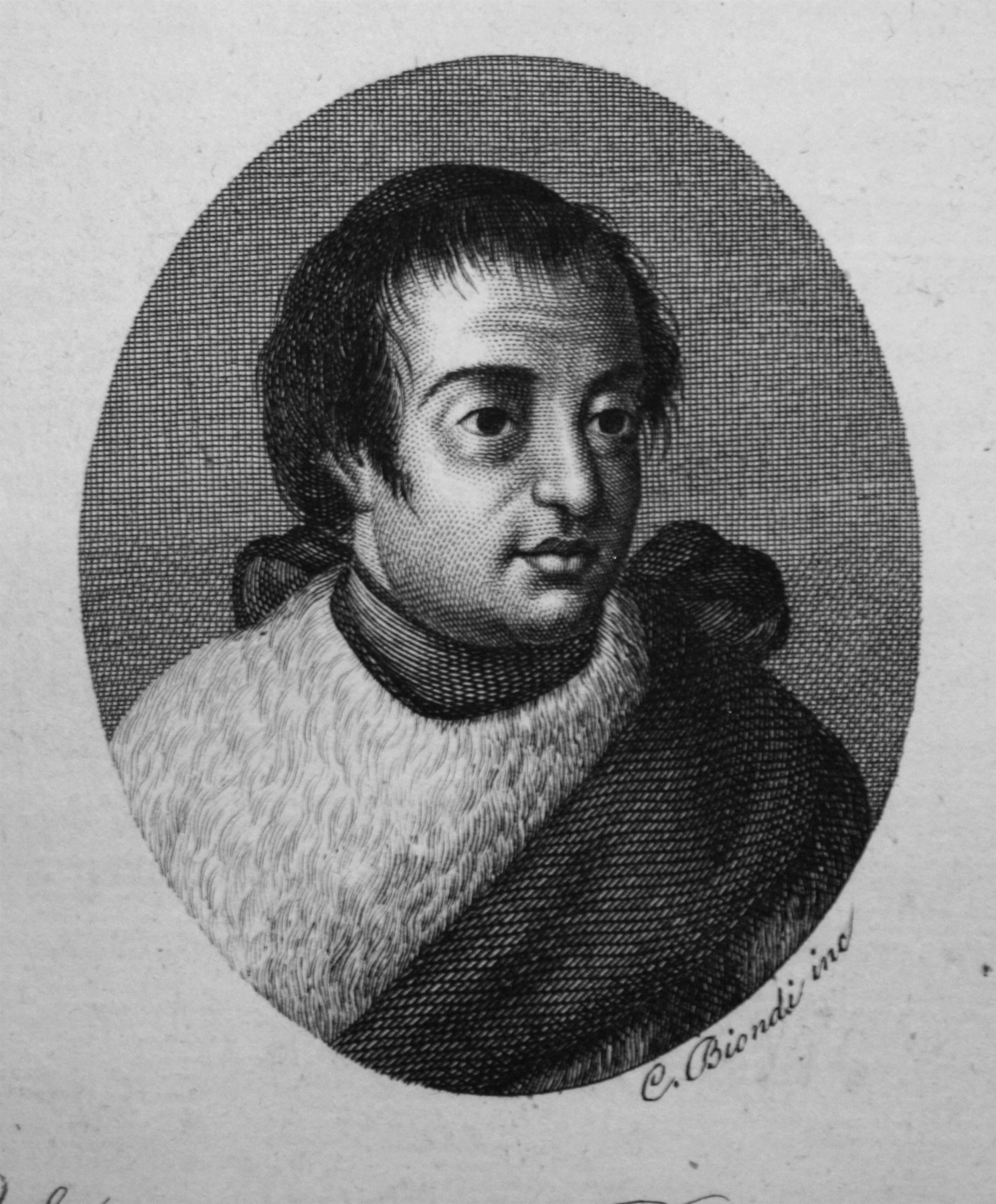
Vitangelo Bisceglia

In 1783, Vitangelo Bisceglia was invited to Altamura by rector Gioacchino de Gemmis, in order for him to teach and become his vicar. Inside the university, Bisceglia could teach, among other things, his favorite subject, i.e. botany, and he also managed the university. In that period, Bisceglia showed that he was also skilled in the field of history and law; he wrote a popular treatise entitled Difesa dei dritti e prerogative della real chiesa di Altamura contro le pretensioni del Vescovo di Gravina (written in Altamura on 7 maggio 1795), in which he proved that the privileges and tax exemptions enjoyed by Altamura Cathedral were legal, ending a long-lasting dispute with the bishop of nearby city Gravina in Puglia. This work granted him a great deal of popularity.

He also established a small botanic garden inside the university.

=== Other professors ===
Other noteworthy professors were Leopoldo Laudati, professor of Ancient Greek and Hebrew grammar, as well as Manfredi, Angelastri and Ruggiero.

== Rectors ==
- Marcello Papiniano Cusani (1748-1752)
- Giuseppe Mastrilli (1753-)
- Bruno Andrisani
- Celestino Guidotti
- Gioacchino de Gemmis (1782-)
- Maffione di Bisceglie
- Gioacchino de Gemmis (1806-1812)

== See also ==
- List of Italian universities
- Altamura
- Gioacchino de Gemmis
- Luca de Samuele Cagnazzi
- Vitangelo Bisceglia
