= Giuseppe Sparano =

Italian cleric and polemicist (1709-1776)

Giuseppe Sparano (21 December 1709 – 5 June 1776) was an Italian cleric and polemicist.

== Biography ==
He was born in Naples and there became a Roman Catholic priest. He became affiliated with the archbishop Giuseppe Spinelli in his mission to refute the errors in the writings of the French Protestant writer Jacques Basnage. He gained the support of the King, who named him archbishop of Acerenza and Matera in 1775–1776. He died in 1776.

Among his works is: Memoria storiche per illustrare gli atti della santa napoletana chiesa e delle congregazione delle apostoliche missioni (1768).
