= Altamura Cathedral =

Cathedral in Altamura, Italy

Coordinates: 40°49′39″N 16°33′11″E

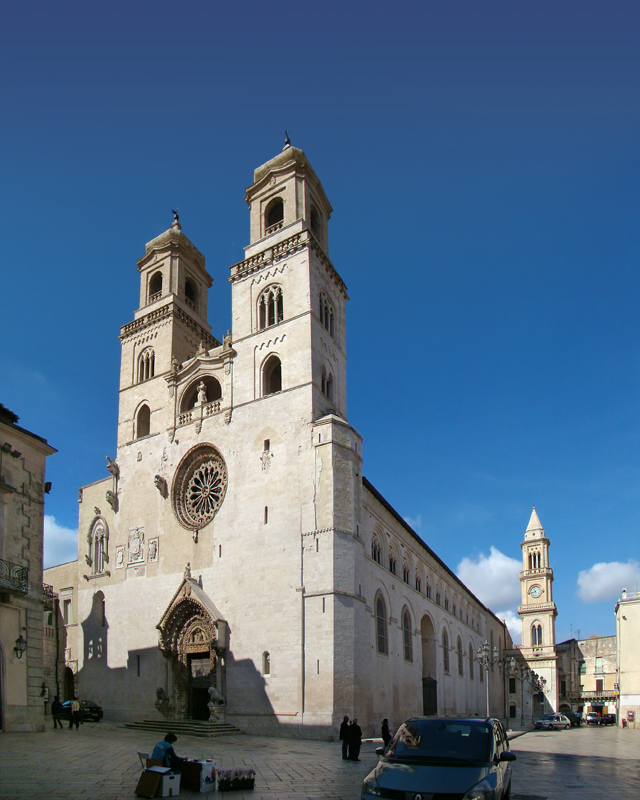
Altamura Cathedral.

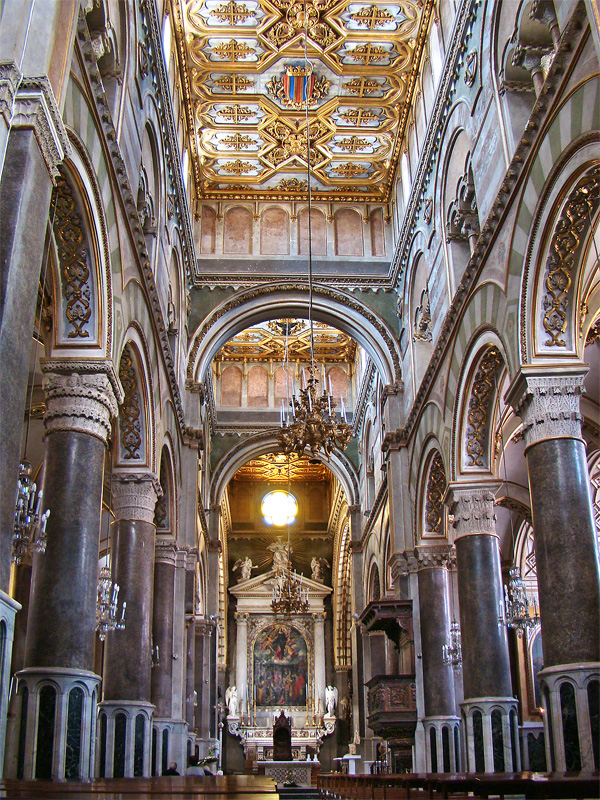
The interior.

Altamura Cathedral (Italian: Duomo di Altamura, Cattedrale di Santa Maria Assunta), dedicated to the Assumption of the Blessed Virgin Mary, is a Roman Catholic cathedral in the city of Altamura, in the Metropolitan City of Bari, Apulia, in southern Italy.

Since 1986 it has been the seat of the Bishop of Altamura-Gravina-Acquaviva delle Fonti, formed in that year. Previously it was the church of the territorial prelature of Altamura (from 1848, Altamura e Acquviva delle Fonti).

== History ==
The church was built by will of emperor Frederick in 1232–1254. The main gate, the portal, the rose window were all on the opposite side that in today's construction, while the altar was located in the area where the main gate is now. In 1248, under pressure from Frederick, Pope Innocent IV declared Altamura exempt from the jurisdiction of the bishop of Bari, making it a "palatine" church, one of four in Apulia.

Historian Domenico Santoro (1688) hypothesized that the church may occupy the location of a Greek or Roman temple dedicated to Castor and Pollux, since on the capitols of the chorus two statues of Castor and Pollux were present at least until the 18th century, before being destroyed. Vitangelo Frizzale (1755), instead, states that it was a temple devoted to Janus (Latin: Ianus bifrons), a Roman deity. This would be confirmed by the presence, in the past, of a two-faced herm on the cusp of the cathedral's ancient façade. However, during the restoration works performed in the 2010s, this sculpture was instead identified as the head of a Saracen. The sculpture had an apotropaic purpose and it evoked the fears of an invasion of Saracens, which, especially in the 16th century, was a widespread fear among Mediterranean Europe Christians.

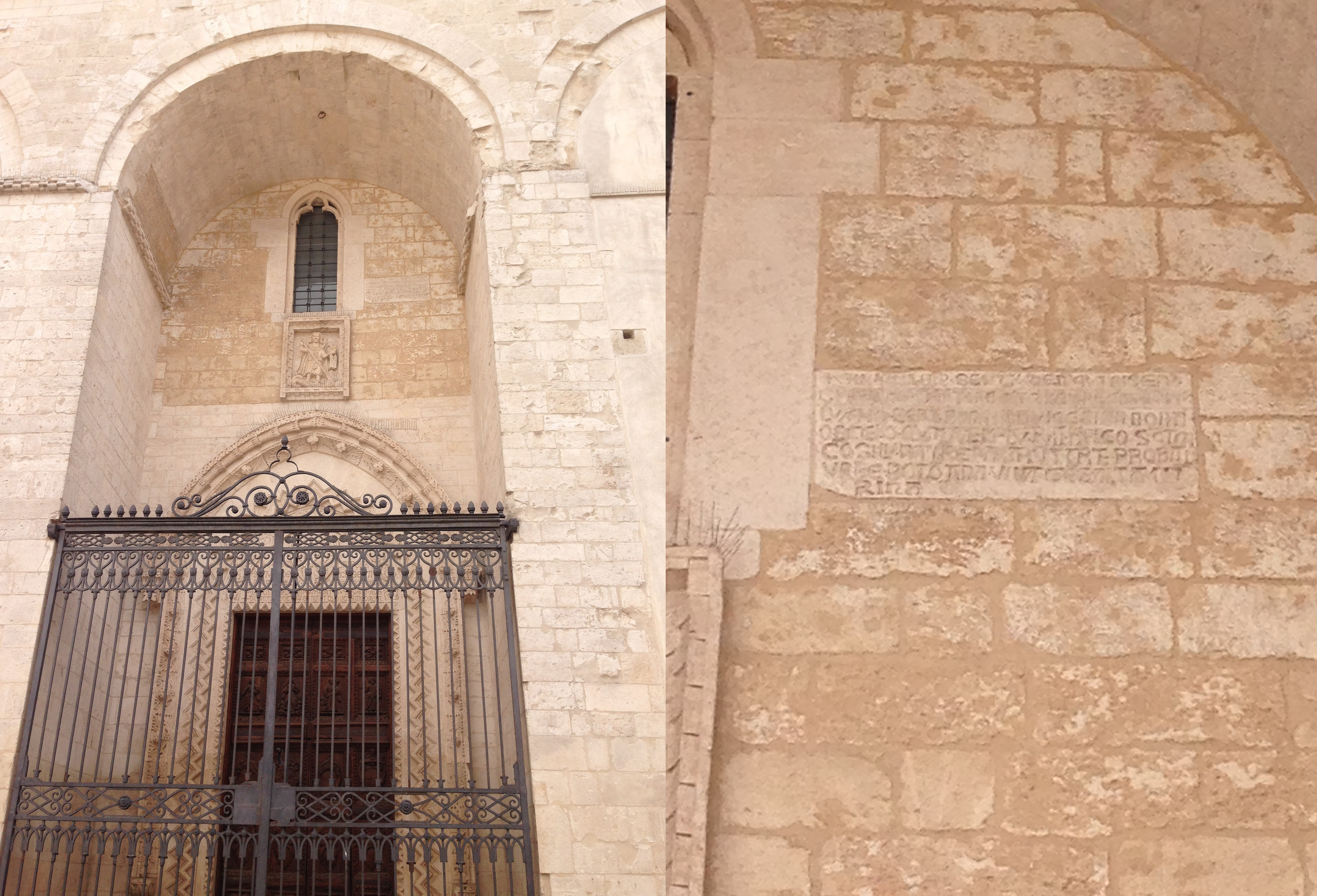
Inscription in Latin, reporting the church collapse on January 29, 1316.

An inscription in Latin, located upon the so-called "Angevin door" (Italian: Porta Angioina), says that the church collapsed on January 29, 1316 and that it was rebuilt with the help of skilled constructors from the nearby Bitonto. The first man who correctly translated this inscription was local historian Ottavio Serena, as he stated in his unfinished work Storia di Altamura. Previous historians incorrectly translated the inscription (which was hard to read and written in bad Latin), assigning the inscription referred to a privilege that Altamura benefited, according to which every year Bitonto's mayor used to come to Altamura to take the price list of the foods and to spread it to the whole province.

The current orientation of the church is opposite to the original one, although it is not known if the change dates to Robert of Anjou's reign (early 14th century) or to the enlargement carried out in 1521–1547. The northern portal dates from Robert's time, while the second bell tower, the altar area and the sacristy were added in the 16th century. From the 18th century are the upper parts of the two bell towers and the small loggia between them. A chamber containing a clock (Altamuran dialect: casa dell'arlogio, Italian: casa dell'orologio) with weights and counterweights, was demolished in the first half of the 16th century and then it was built again, and its latter shape it appears an 18th-century painting of Saint Irene in the Council Hall of the city of Altamura. In the same painting, a thunder is shown hitting the tower of the cathedral; this refers to a real accident, which occurred in 1726. According to the sources, the thunder hit the cathedral twice, and it considerably damaged it. Over the following three years, restoration works were carried out and the towers were also extended. Domes were also added to each of the two towers (as shown in the previous paintings, the domes had not been built yet).

On the place where today is the clock tower, just above the seats, the cathedral also had a secondary rose window and other surrounding windows, which are now walled.

In 1729, the statues of the Assumption of Mary (Italian: Assunta) and of the two saints Peter and Paul were made and then added. In the following years, the clock chamber was turned into a Baroque loggia which is now visible between the two towers.

In 1858 (just three days before the Unification of Italy), the clock tower was added (designed by architect Corradino de Judicibus).

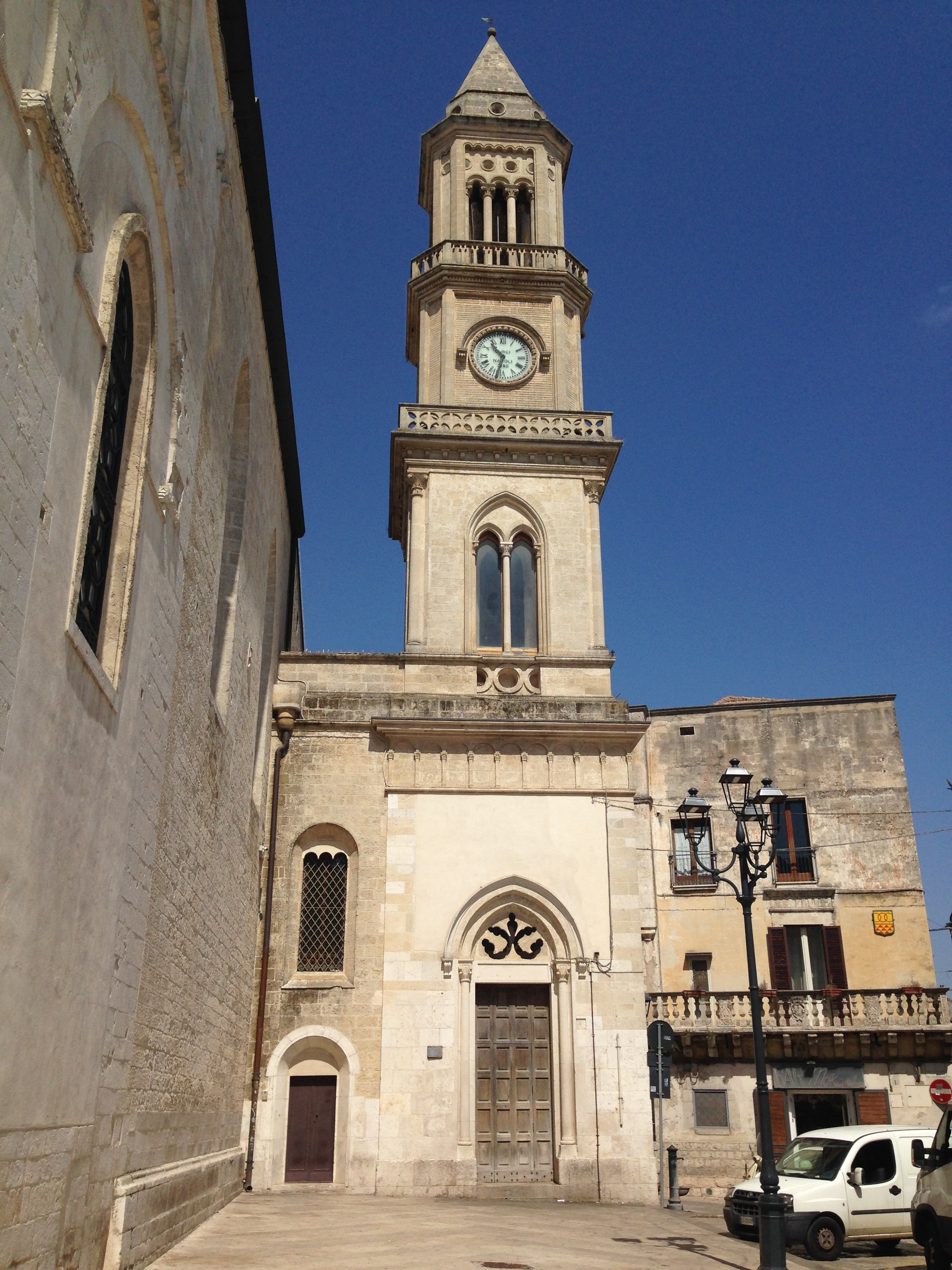
The clock tower, added in 1858.

Altamura Cathedral has been restored in 2006 The works have restored the external walls of the cathedral to their original white color. Another restoration work has been carried out in 2017 for the floor, the lighting system, the three entrance portals and other wooden structures.

== Architecture ==
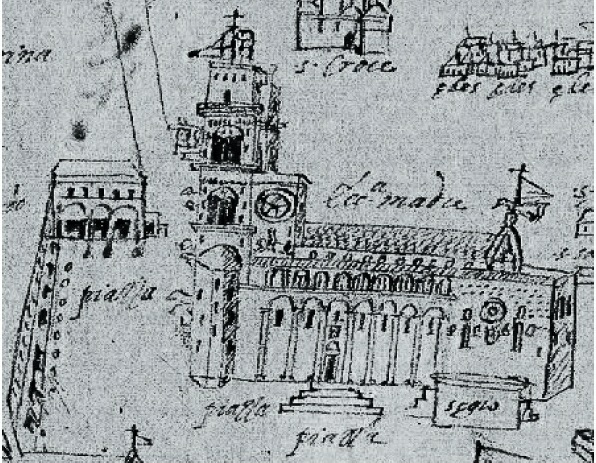
The cathedral in the final years of the 16th century

=== Exterior ===
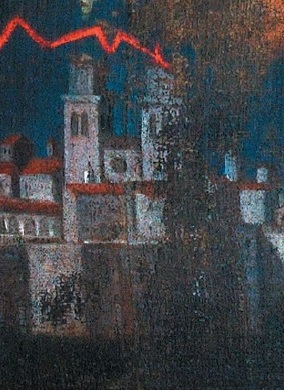
View of Altamura (from the gate porta Bari) - Painting of Saint Irene (first half of the 18th century) - Council Hall of the city of Altamura

The façade has two tall bell towers with two orders in the right one, and three (including the first in Romanesque style, in the left one, which are joined by a small loggia surmounted by a tympanum. Most portals and windows have Gothic pointed arches (as also Frederick II's Castel del Monte has). The loggia houses a small statue of the Immaculate Virgin, while two statues of Sts. Peter and Paul are located at the tympanum sides. Under the loggia is a 14th-century rose window, with 15 rays and, at its center, a bas relief depicting the Agnus Dei. At the left of the rose windows are three coat of arms: the center one belonged to 16th century emperor Charles V, while the other two date from the 16th century restoration works. Further to the left is a mullioned window with Eastern art-like decorations from the original Frederick II's building.

The façade is completed by a 14th-century portal, included within a prothyrum supported by two columns that have, at their base, two sculpture of lions (1533). At the top is a tympanum with the coats of arms of the House of Anjou and of the princes of Taranto, rulers of Altamura in the late 14th century. The portal is decorated with numerous sculpted Biblical scenes: in the lunette is a Virgin with Child and Two Angels; in the architrave is a Last Supper: finally, the arches houses 22 scenes from the Gospels, depicting Jesus' life from the Annunciation to the Pentecost.

=== Interior ===
The church has a nave and two aisles separated by columns and pillars, with matronaea at the sides. The capitals, in Byzantine style, are the last decoration detail visible today of the original Frederick II's building, together with the matronaea and the apse at the left of the portal.

The nave, with a wooden ceiling decorated with gilded stuccoes, ends in a large 18th century high altar, executed in 1736–1793. The altarpiece is an Assumption of the Virgin by Leonardo Castellano (1546). The presbytery houses a lavishly decorated wooden choir from 1543, a stone ambon with sculpted scenes from Jesus' life, and a wooden pulpit also dating from the 16th century.

The aisles feature six side chapels each. The first left chapel is home to a polychrome wooden nativity scene from 1587. The fourth left chapel, dedicated to St. Joseph, is in Baroque and includes a polychrome marble altar with the statue of the saint holding Jesus' hand with a baldachin.

The church also houses a canvas by Domenico Morelli depicting St. Paul's Conversion (1876).

== Gallery ==
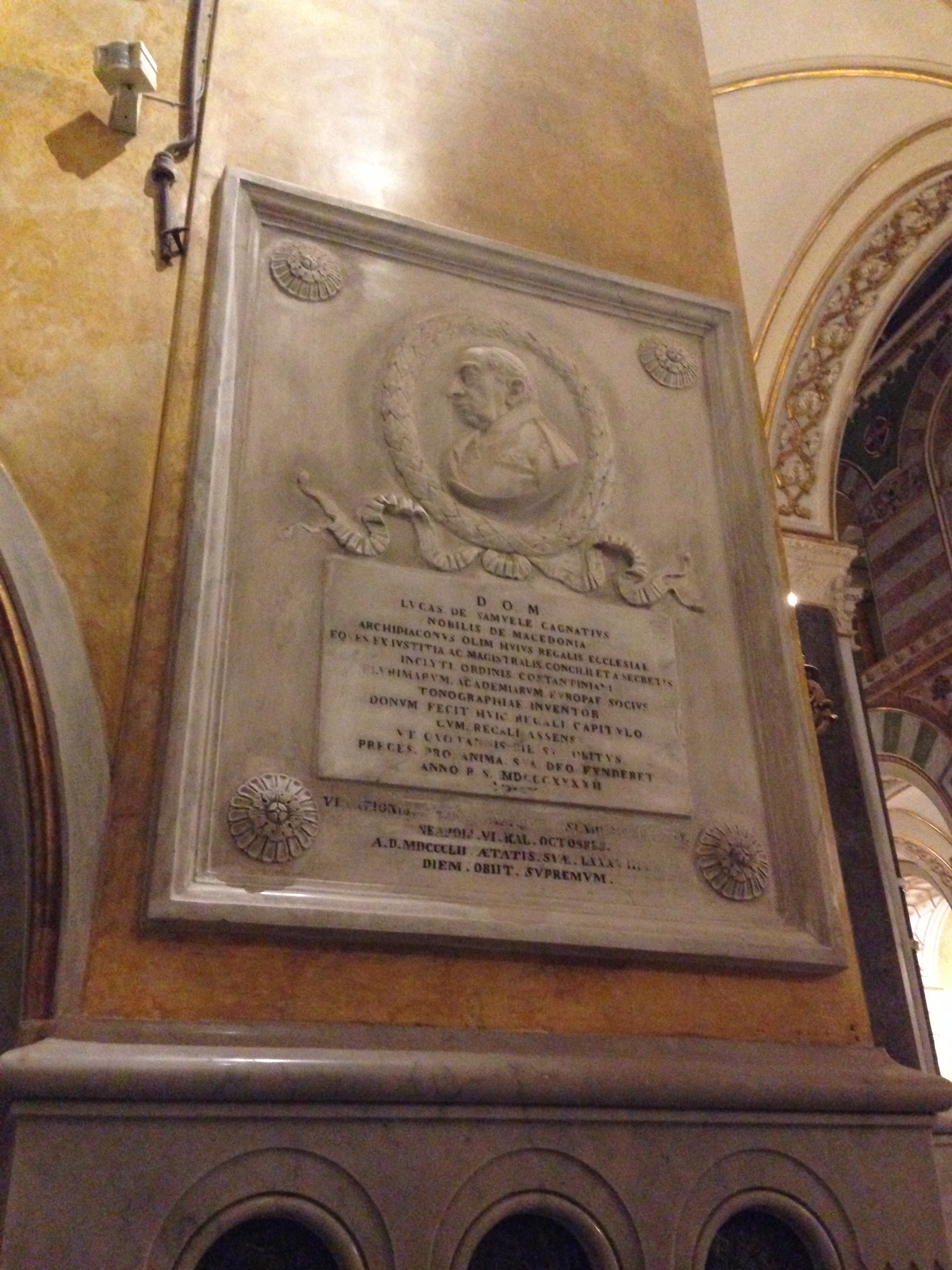
Commemorative plaque about Italian scientist Luca de Samuele Cagnazzi, located inside "Cappellone di San Giuseppe".

== Sources ==
- Blanchard, Paul, 1990: Southern Italy from Rome to Calabria: The Blue Guides, 7th edn., p. 345. London: A & C Black
- Berloco, Tommaso (1985). Storie inedite della città di Altamura (in Italian). ATA - Associazione Turistica Altamurana Pro Loco.
- Pupillo, Giuseppe (2017). Altamura, immagini e descrizioni storiche (PDF). Matera: Antezza Tipografi. ISBN 9788889313282. Archived from the original (PDF) on 2018-10-21.
- Luca de Samuele Cagnazzi (1944). Alessandro Cutolo (ed.). La mia vita. Milan: Ulrico Hoepli.
