= List of historical reenactment events =

This is a list of historical reenactment events.

== Comparison of events ==
Name	Dates	Location	Period	Hosts	Based on	Style
Battle of Austerlitz reenactment	December	Slavkov u Brna, Czech Republic	19th century	Projekt Austerlitz	Battle of Austerlitz	Battle / Commemoration
Battle of Evesham Festival and Reenactment	First weekend in August	Evesham, England	13th century	Battle of Evesham	Battle of Evesham	Battle / Commemoration
Battle of Hastings reenactment	October	Battle, England	11th century	English Heritage	Battle of Hastings	Battle
Battle of Waterloo reenactment	June	Waterloo, Belgium	19th century		Battle of Waterloo	Battle
Bristol Renaissance Faire	July to September	Bristol, Wisconsin, USA	Renaissance		n/a	Renaissance fair
Caldicot	September	Caldicot, Wales	Middle Ages		n/a	Renaissance fair / battle
Colonial Faire	July	Oak Glen, San Bernardino County, California	18th Century, American Colonial	Riley's Farm	Boston Massacre Colonial Life	Living History Education / Faire / Reenactment
Cosmeston		Cosmeston, Wales	Middle Ages	Cosmeston Medieval Village	n/a	Informal skirmishes
Civil War Remembrance	Memorial Day weekend	Greenfield Village, Dearborn, Michigan, USA	American Civil War	Greenfield Village	n/a	Living history, tactical demonstrations
D-Day reenactment	August	Conneaut, Ohio, United States	World War II	D-Day Ohio, Inc. / Conneaut Township	Pre-invasion Encampments in England, Occupied France / Normandy beaches invasion / road and bridge battle scenarios	Battles / Commemoration / Living History / Veterans
Dixie Days	varies	Mechanicsville, Virginia, USA	American Civil War	Local Sons of Confederate Veterans camps	Various battles	Combat reenactment
East Anglia Medieval Fayre	July, September (planned)	Bury St Edmunds, England	Middle Ages	Early Medieval Alliance	n/a	Renaissance fair / battle
Living History Festival	June	Weald & Downland Living Museum	17th Century through to World War II	Weald & Downland Living Museum		Living History Education / Festival / Reenactment
Pennsic War	Late July / early August; lasts 17 days	Slippery Rock, Pennsylvania	Pre-17th century	Society for Creative Anachronism	n/a	Yearly battle between East and Middle SCA kingdoms; classes, shopping
Redesdale Uprising – A Commission of Array	September	near Gettysburg, Pennsylvania, USA	15th century	Lord Grey's Retinue	a commission of array	Reenactment / living history
Rapska Fjera	July 25 - July 27	Rab, Croatia	Medieval/ Renaissance	n/a	n/a	Renaissance fair / tournament
Siege of Groenlo reenactment	October	Groenlo, Netherlands	17th century		Siege of Groenlo (1627)	Battle / fair
Templecombe Medieval Pageant	June 1 & 2	Templecombe, England	Middle Ages	Phoenix Warlords	n/a	Renaissance fair / battle
Battle of Tewkesbury reenactment	2nd weekend in July	Tewkesbury, England	15th century		Battle of Tewkesbury	Battle
The Virginia Renaissance Faire	Mid-May through mid-June; weekends	near Spotsylvania, Virginia, USA	15th century		Such stuff as dreams are made on.	Reenactment / living history
Zeitreise Fulda	Second Weekend of August	Schloß Fasanerie Fulda Germany	18th. century	Hessen Militaer Hessische Militär und Zivilgeschichte	Reenactment of Revolutionary War Battles in America	Battle, Fair, Living History, Reenactment
Poland Through the Ages: A Living History Faire	Memorial Day Weekend	Fountainville, Pennsylvania	10th Century-Present	Polish Living History	Historical reenactment. Siege of Jasna Gora. Slavic Vikings. Polish Pioneers in America. WWI, WWII ... etc.	Living history. Military & civilian life.

== Australia ==
- 1988 First Fleet Re-enactment Voyage

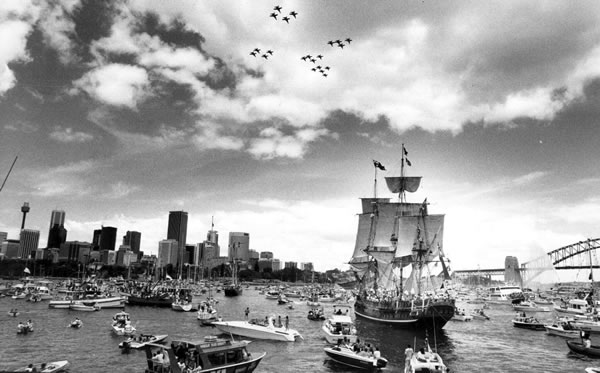
Tall ship First Fleet re-enactment on Sydney Harbour, Australia Day, 1988. The Australian Bicentenary was marked with much ceremony across Australia.

== Germany ==
- Zeitreise Fulda

== Italy ==
- Federicus

== Netherlands ==
- Battle of Grolle

== Poland ==
- Battle of Grunwald reenactment

== Russian Federation ==
- Battle of Borodino (Borodino Museum, Mozhaysky district, Moscow oblast)
- Bylinniy bereg (Kimry, Tver oblast).
- Defense of Moscow (Borodino Museum, Mozhaysky district, Moscow oblast)
- Doushonovo Festival (Doushonovo Manoeuvres)

== South Africa ==
- Battle of Blood River
- Battle of Isandlwana
- Battle of Majuba Hill

== Spain ==
- Battle of Almansa reenactment

== United Kingdom ==
- Eglinton Tournament of 1839
- Largs Viking Festival Battle of Largs
- War and Peace Revival
- Whitehall Parade, London, commemorating the execution of King Charles I (The King's Army) 28 January 2007

== United States ==
=== Military ===
- Battle of Averasborough, North Carolina
- Battle of Bentonville, North Carolina
- Battle of Chancellorsville, Virginia
- Battle of Gettysburg, Pennsylvania
- Battle of the Little Bighorn, Montana
- Battle of Olustee, Florida
- Battle of Waynesboro, Virginia
- Big Cypress Shootout, Florida
- Boston Massacre, reenactment in Oak Glen, California
- Camp Harding, Pennsylvania
- D-Day Conneaut, Ohio
- Numerous events at Fort Ticonderoga, New York
- Assault on Fort Ontario "Something Wicked This Way Comes" Oswego, NY
- Poland Through the Ages: A Living History Faire Fountainville, PA

=== Renaissance fairs ===
- Alabama Renaissance Faire, Alabama
- Arizona Renaissance Festival, Arizona
- Bristol Renaissance Faire, Wisconsin
- Carolina Renaissance Festival, North Carolina
- Georgia Renaissance Festival, Georgia
- Kansas City Renaissance Festival, Kansas
- Kentucky Highland Renaissance Festival, Kentucky
- King Richard's Faire, Massachusetts
- Koroneburg Renaissance Festival, California
- Louisiana Renaissance Festival, Louisiana
- Maryland Renaissance Festival, Maryland
- Michigan Renaissance Festival, Michigan
- Middlefaire, Texas
- Minnesota Renaissance Festival, Minnesota
- New York Renaissance Faire, New York
- Ohio Renaissance Festival, Ohio
- Pennsylvania Renaissance Faire, Pennsylvania
- Pittsburgh Renaissance Festival, Pennsylvania
- Renaissance Pleasure Faire of Southern California, California
- Scarborough Renaissance Festival, Texas
- Sterling Renaissance Festival, New York
- Texas Renaissance Festival, Texas
- Virginia Renaissance Faire, Virginia
- Wicked Winter Renaissance Faire, New Jersey

=== Rendezvous ===
- Spirit of Vincennes Rendezvous, Indiana
- Feast of the Hunter's Moon West Lafayette, Indiana
- Bridgeton Mountain Man Rendezvous Bridgeton, Indiana
- Southwestern Regional Rendezvous, Arkansas
- Rocky Mountain National Rendezvous, location changes year to year (past events held in MT, CO, WY)
- Colonial Faire (http://www.rileysfarm.com/faire) Oak Glen, California
- Gathering at Garst Greenville, Ohio
- Feast of the Strawberry Moon Grand Rapids, Michigan
- Gathering at the Crossing Cayuga, Indiana
- Woolaroc 1840’S Mountain Man Camp Bartlesville, Oklahoma
- Paiute Mountain Rendezvous, California
- Joliet Muzzleloaders Spring Rendezvous, Illinois

=== Colonial/Frontier Fairs and Markets ===
- Colonial Market Days Lebanon, Indiana
- Fair at New Boston, Ohio
- Colonial Market & Fair Mount Vernon, Virginia
- Kalamazoo Living History Show Kalamazoo, Michigan
- The 18th Century Colonial Trade Fair at Wolf Creek Loudonville, Ohio

=== Other ===
- 1940's World War II Era Ball, Colorado
- Victorian Day in Historic Grand Ledge, Michigan
- The Palace Garden Party Colonial Williamsburg, Virginia
- Living History Weekend, Fort Ligonier, Pennsylvania
- Revolutionary War Living History Weekend, Pennsylvania
- Numerous events at Fort Ticonderoga, New York
- Revolutionary War Weekend, Mount Vernon, Virginia
- History Alive at Fort Piqua, Ohio
- River Through Time Coldwater, Michigan
- Stone's Trace Historical Society Pioneer Festival Ligonier, Indiana
- River of Time Bay City, Michigan
- Apple Festival of Kendallville Kendallville, Indiana
- Johnny Appleseed Festival Fort Wayne, Indiana
- Fort Harrod Settlement & Raid Harrodsburg, Kentucky

== See also ==
- Historical reenactment
- List of historical reenactment groups
