= List of Renaissance and Medieval fairs =

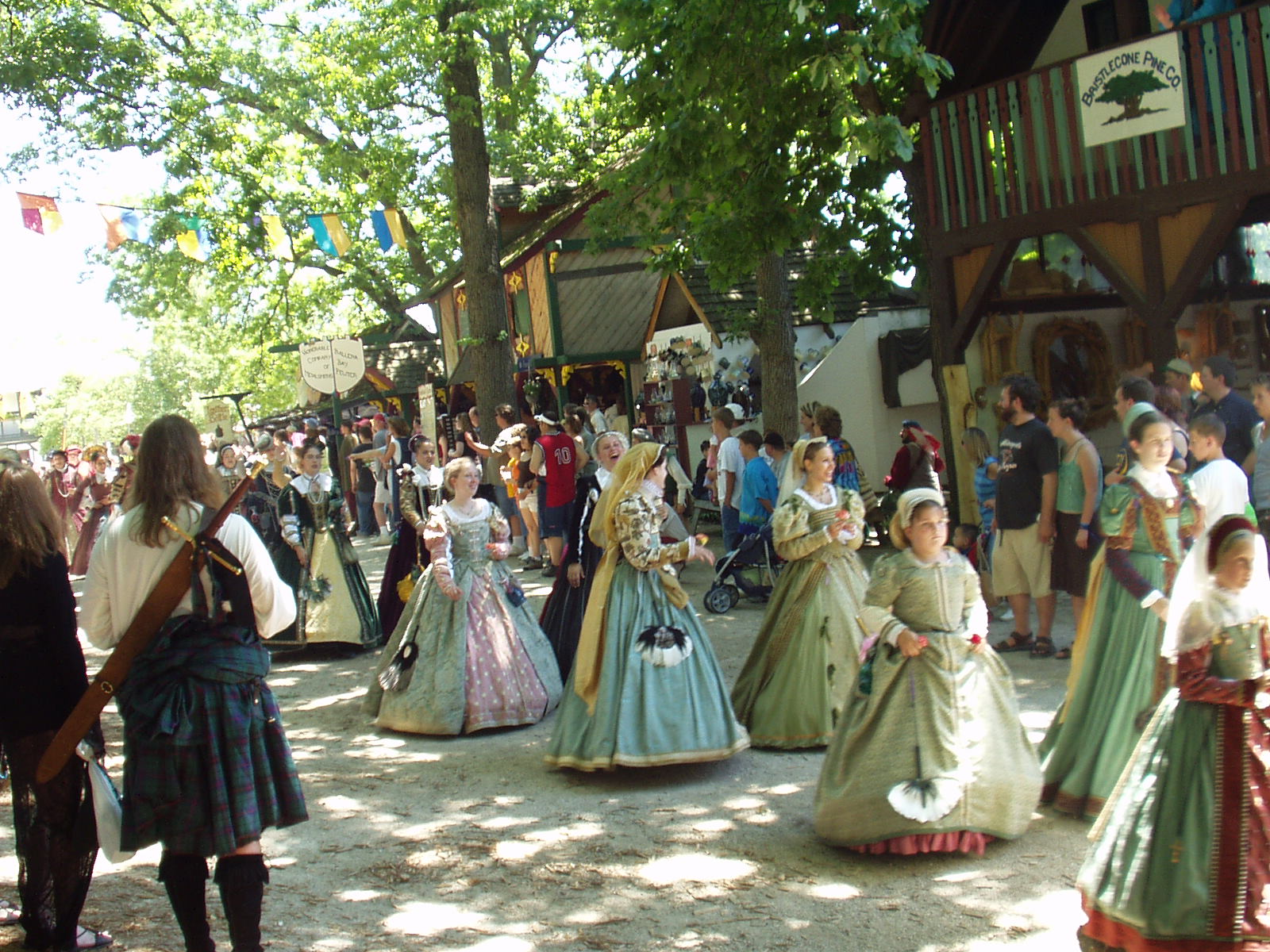
Daily Grand March of the royals at the Bristol Renaissance Faire in 2003

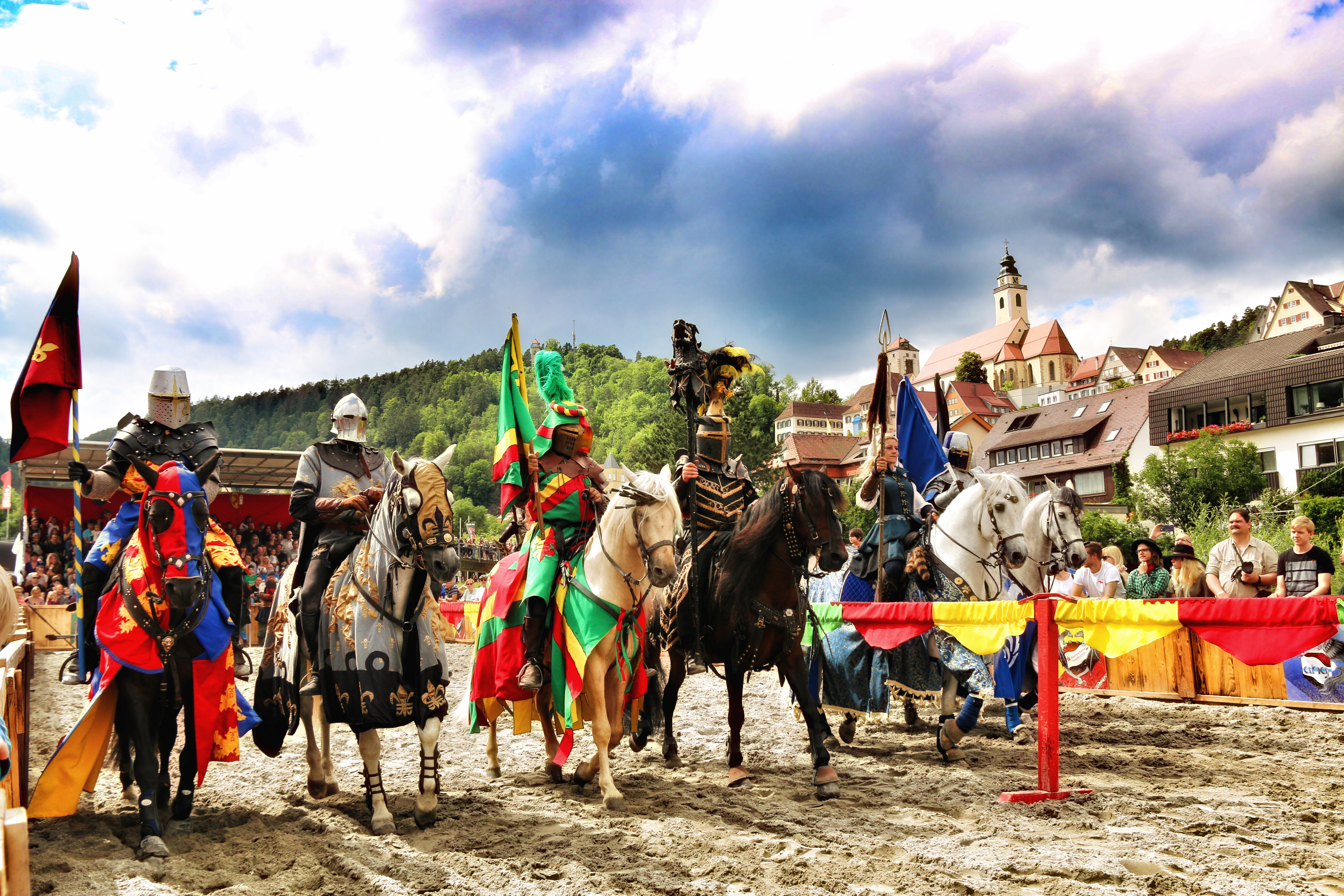
The Medieval Fair at Horb am Neckar (South Germany) 2019

This is a list of Renaissance faires and other Medieval-themed faires worldwide.

== North America ==
=== United States ===
Included below are the notable Renaissance, Medieval, and Fantasy fairs held in the United States. These include: any long running (20 plus years) fairs, and established fairs (5 plus years) that have a two-weekend or more annual run. Generally, U.S. renaissance fairs are open weekends only (including holidays) during the periods indicated. (Dates are codified to facilitate searching by date.)

List of Notable Renaissance and Medieval Faires in the US
Name	State	Fair Site and Type^{†}	Setting and Info	Start Date	Stage, Area, Amenities^{≠}	When Held	Highest Patron Count^{≠}	References and External links
Age of Chivalry Renaissance Festival	Nevada	Sunset Park, Paradise; recurring event	Five Renaissance villages; Renaissance, Hobbits, Fantasy	1994	4 stages; limited camping; RVs^{≠}	(10b) mid-October (3 days)	11k	LV Ren Fair
Alabama Renaissance Faire	Alabama	Wilson Park; Florence; recurring event	The shire of Fountain on the Green	1987	2 stages; pets OK; free admission^{≠}	(10d) 4th Weekend of October (2 days)	30k - 40k	Alabama's official state renaissance fair Al Ren Faire
Arizona Renaissance Festival	Arizona	Gold Canyon, Pinal County; permanent site	Village of Fairhaven	1989	12 stages; 300 acres^{≠}	(02a) early February–April (7 weekends)	265k^{≠} (2004)	Arizona RenFest
Bay Area Renaissance Festival	Florida	Withlacoochee River Park, Pasco County; recurring event	Village of Fittleworth during the reign of Henry VIII and Katherine Parr; Germanic mercenaries, Celts, fantasy elements	1979	10 stages; 260 acres; parking; tailgating; dogs allowed^{≠}	(02b) mid-February–early April (7 weekends)	80k (1990s)	Bay Area RenFest
Brevard Renaissance Fair	Florida	Castle Park, Melbourne; semi-permanent site	Wickham Forest; Viking, Celts; Pirates; Heroes; Fantasy	2015	9 stages; 20 acres; pets allowed	(02a) January–February (5 weekends)	70k^{≠} (2020)	Brevard Renaissance Fair
Bristol Renaissance Faire	Wisconsin	Bristol; permanent site	1574 Bristol, England; Tudor, some fantasy aspects;	1972*	16 stages; 30 fair acres; parking^{≠}	(07b) July–Labor Day weekend (8 weekends)	400k (1990)	*Opened 1972 as King Richard's Fair; renamed 1988; Bristol Faire
Camelot Days Medieval Festival	Florida	Topeekeegee Yugnee Park, Hollywood; recurring event	Arthurian times, c.1100	2003	3 stages; free admission; city parking; service animals only^{≠}	(11b) mid-November (2 weekends)	<5k (2012)	Camelot Days
Canterbury Renaissance Faire	Oregon	Silverton; semi-permanent	Village of Canterbury; Elizabethan England (1560–1600)	2009	3 stages, 6+ acres; parking–shuttle^{≠}	(07c) last two weekends in July	10k (2012)	Canterbury Faire
Carolina Renaissance Festival	North Carolina	Huntersville; permanent site	Marketplace at the "Village of Fairhaven"; knights, sea fairies, fantasy	1994	10 stages, 25 acres; free parking^{≠}	(10a) October–November (8 weekends)	210k (2017)	Carolina Renaissance Festival
Central Coast Renaissance Faire	California	Laguna Lake Park; San Luis Obispo, California; recurring event	The 1585 Shire of Donneybrook, England; Renaissance period	1992	3 stages; paid public parking	(07b) mid-July (1 week)	7k^{≠} (2022)	Central Coast Renaissance Faire
Colorado Renaissance Festival	Colorado	Larkspur; permanent site	A 16th-century Tudor village of King Henry and Queen Anne; pirates, fantasy elements	1975	7 stages; 60 fair acres; 338 total acres; camping; parking^{≠}	(06c) mid-June–August (8 weekends)	250k (2017)	Colorado Renaissance
Connecticut Renaissance Faire (Fall)	Connecticut	Lebanon; semi-permanent	Harvest Festival at the Village of Lebanshire; Elizabethan England, cosplay, time travelers, romance, hobbits, faeries, pirates, vikings	1999	13 stages; after hours events; pub crawl; parking; pets allowed;^{≠}	(08b) late-August–late-October (9 weekends), including holiday Mondays	50k^{≠} (2022)	CT Faire
Robin Hood's Medieval FaireAs of 09/2026, this faire will not be returning in 2027.	Connecticut	Fairgrounds, Connecticut; semi-permanent	Nottingham Forest, England (c.476 – 1400 AD); Robin Hood; cosplay; fantasy elements	2010	5 stages; pets week	(05b) mid-May–July (6 weekends)	unk (2013)	Robin Hoods Faire
Florida Renaissance Festival – Deerfield Beach	Florida	Quiet Waters Park, Deerfield Beach	16th-century	1993	stages	(02a) February–March (4 weekends)	90k (2012)	Florida RenFest
Florida Renaissance Festival – Miami	Florida	Cauley Square Historic Village, Miami; semi-permanent	Early 16th-century village	2009	stages	(04a) April	45k (2012)	Florida RenFest
Georgia Renaissance Festival	Georgia	Fairburn; permanent	Village of Newcastle, during the reign of King Henry VIII	1986	32 acres	(04c) mid-April–June	250k (2004)	Georgia Ren Fest
Great Lakes Medieval Faire and Marketplace	Ohio	Rock Creek; permanent	13th-century forest Kingdom of Avaloch; historic, fantasy, super-heroes, futuristic	1992	13 fair acres	(07a) early July–mid-August (6 weekends)	45k (2007)	Medieval Faire
Great Plains Renaissance Festivals	Kansas	Wichita	Shire of Talonterra, 1300 AD	2004	stages	(04b) mid-April and (10b) mid-October	unk	Great Plains
Hoggetowne Medieval Faire	Florida	Alachua County Fairgrounds, Gainesville; permanent	Village of Hoggetowne, during King Arthur's reign	1987	stages	(01c) late January–early February	50k (2011)	Hoggetowne Fair
Kansas City Renaissance Festival	Kansas	Bonner Springs; permanent	1536 in Canterbury; Henry VIII, pirates, some fantasy, Robin Hood	1977	16 acres	(09a) September–mid-October	200k 2022)	Kansas City RenFest
Kentucky Highland Renaissance Festival	Kentucky	Eminence; permanent	Briarwood, Scotland during the 14th-century reign of King Robert the Bruce	2005	113 acres	(06a) early June–early July	25k	Highlands Ren Faire
King Richard's Faire	Massachusetts	Carver; permanent	16th-century Village of Carvershire marketplace	1982	stages; 80 acres, 10 festival acres (approx.)	(09a) September–late October	unk	King Richard's Faire
Koroneburg Renaissance Festival	California	Riverview Recreation Park, Corona; permanent	Baron Heinrich von Lauffer's estate, in a German village located along the Rhine, c.1450–1600	1998	5 stages; 120-acre park; 9 festival acres	(05b) last weekend of May–June (5 weekends)	unk	Koroneburg Renaissance Festival
Louisiana Renaissance Festival	Louisiana	Hammond	Fall harvest in the 16th-century English Village ofAlbright	1999	stages	(11a) early November – mid-December	25k (2007)	Louisiana Renaissance
Maryland Renaissance Festival	Maryland	Crownsville; permanent	Village of Revel Grove, a Tudor village	1977	25 fair acres; 85 parking acres	(08c) late August–late October (5 weekends)	280k (2012)	Maryland Renaissance Festival
Medieval Fair of Norman, Oklahoma	Oklahoma	Reaves Park, Norman; recurring event	London, under the reign of King Edward III c.1350; some fantasy elements	1977	8 stages, 25 acres, free admission	(04a) First weekend (Fri—Sun) in April	350k (2015)	Medieval Fair of Norman
Michigan Renaissance Festival	Michigan	Holly; permanent	Hollygrove Village, late 16th-century England	1979	100 acres; 17 acres (festival grounds)	(08b) mid-August–end of September (6 weekends)	230k (2004)	Michigan Renaissance Festival
Mid-Michigan Renaissance Festival	Michigan	Frankenmuth/Vasser; permanent	Queen Anna of Bohemia, Martin Luther, mythical and fantasy characters	2008	5 fair acres; 12 parking acres	(06a) June	unk	Mid-Michigan RenFest
Middlefaire Renaissance Festival	Texas	Hillsboro; permanent	1652 AD in "Wiltonshire"; buccaneers, baroque characters, fantasy elements, 3 events (June: Texas Pirate Festival; July: Magical & Medieval Fantasy Faire; November: Middlefaire).	2006	21 acres; camping	(06a) early June: T.P.F. (07b) mid-July: M&M Fest (10c) late October: Middlefaire	-5k (2012)	Texas Middlefaire Events
Midsummer Fantasy Renaissance Faire	Connecticut	Warsaw Park, Ansonia	The Anleighshire, Kingdom of Cuulayne; fictional King Tonitrus; fantasy immersion	2011	parking	(06b) mid-June–July (3 weeknds)	unk	Midsummer Fantasy Renaissance Faire
Minnesota Renaissance Festival	Minnesota	Shakopee; permanent	16th-century "England-like" fantasy kingdom	1971	stages; 22 acres	(08b) mid-August–September (6 weekends)	300k (2012)	Minnesota Renaissance Festival
Mythical & Medieval Fest	South Carolina	RH Acres, Myrtle Beach	Renaissance times; Fantasy, Viking, Pirates	2014	15 acres	(11b) 2nd weekend in November	-5k (in 2019)	Mythical & Medieval Fest
New Hampshire Renaissance Faire	New Hampshire	Fremont, temporary	Undetermined period; annual charity event	2004	–	(05b) Mid-May for two consecutive weekends	appx. 4500	New Hampshire RenFaire
New Jersey Renaissance Faire	New Jersey	Burlington County Fairegrounds, Columbus; permanent	16th-century fictional Village of New Crossford, Northumberland; historical and fictional "visitors from time" such as Shakespeare, Robin Hood, King Arthur; fantasy elements	2009	60 acres (including 7 acre lake)	(05d) mid-May-early-June (4 weekends)	12k (2015)	New Jersey Renaissance Faire
New York Renaissance Faire	New York	Tuxedo; permanent	The fictional Town of Sterling in late 16th-century Elizabethan England	1977	20 stages; 65 acres	(08a) August–October (8 weekends)	140k (2010)	Ren Faire–NY
Northern California Renaissance Faire	California	Hollister	Village of Willingtown, Derbyshire; mid-1600s	2004	stages; 11 acres	(09b) mid-September–mid-October (6 weekends)	150k	NorCal RenFaire
Nottingham Festival	California	Simi Valley; Recurring	Town of Nottingham, Elizabethan England	2013	–	(11a) November	unk	Nottingham Festival
Ohio Renaissance Festival	Ohio	Harveysburg; permanent	1572 AD in the English Village of Willy-Nilly-on-the-Wash	1990	30 acres	(09a) September–October (9 weekends)	180k	Renaissance Festival
Oklahoma Renaissance Festival	Oklahoma	Muskogee; permanent	1569 in Elizabethan Castleton, on the border of Scotland and England	1995	30 fair acres; 40 acres parking; 22 stages	(04b) Late April through first weekend June (6weekends)	88k (2017)	The Castle of Muskogee
Oregon Renaissance Faire	Oregon	Canby;	1563 in the Scottish Vale of Dunrose; features Mary, Queen of Scots	2016	5 Stages, Jousting Arena, 2 pubs, parking	(06a)June (4 weekends)	unk	Oregon Renaissance Faire
OzFaire	Missouri	West Plains; Heart of the Ozarks Bluegrass Park	Fantasy Elements, Pirates, Court	2024	2 stages; limited camping; RVs;	October (Second Weekend in October)	2k	OzFaire
Pennsylvania Renaissance Faire	Pennsylvania	Mount Hope Estate Manheim; permanent	Shire of Mount Hope; features Marlowe, Shakespeare and Elizabeth I, Tudor theme (ag: Henry VIII)	1981	stages; 35 acres	(08a) August–October (thirteen weekends)	250k	Penn Faire
Pittsburgh Renaissance Festival	Pennsylvania	West Newton; permanent	16th century Morelandshire	1994	20 fair acres; 280 parking acres	(08c) late August–September (6 weekends)	55k (2005)	Pittsburgh RenFest
Ren in the Glen	Wisconsin	Glenwood City; recurring event	"Thornberry;" Medieval, Renaissance, Fantasy	2012	5 Stages; free parking, dogs allowed	(07d) Last weekend in July (2 days)	>3k (2024)	Ren in the Glen
Renaissance Festival of Nebraska	Nebraska	Papillion	"Crownsbury" 15th to 16th century	2008	8 Festival acres: 20 parking acres	(05a) First 3 weekends in May	25k	Renaissance Festival of Nebraska
The Maine Renaissance Faire	Maine	Acton, Maine; moving to Springvale, Maine	unspecified	2019	9 stages	(07c) Last 2 weekends in July	unknown	The Maine Renaissance Faire
Renaissance Pleasure Faire of Southern California	California	Santa Fe Dam Recreation Area; Irwindale; Recurring	The late 16th-century market at Port Deptford	1962	20 acres	(04a) April–late May	200k (2004)	Oldest Ren-Faire in the US; SoCal RenFair
Riverdale Kiwanis Medieval Faire	Florida	Lakes Park, Ft. Myers	Medieval period, 900 – 1300 AD	1996	–	(01b) mid-January (2 weekends)	unk	Medieval Faire
St. Louis Renaissance Festival	Missouri	Wentzville; permanent	16th-century Petit Lyon, France during a visit from King François I	1999	stages	(09a) mid-September–mid-October	50k	St. Louis Renaissance Faire
Sarasota Medieval Fair	Florida	Woods of Mallaranny, Myakka City; permanent	Medieval Period, 9th - 15th Century	2005	4 stages, Human Combat Chess Match, Jousting, 3 pubs (2 permanent), Children's Realm	November	25k (2011)	Sarasota MedFair
Scarborough Renaissance Festival	Texas	Waxahachie; permanent	1521 Town of Scarborough, under King Henry VIII	1981	35 acres	(04a) early April–Memorial Day (7 weekends)	200k (2010)	Scarborough Fair
Sherwood Forest Faire	Texas	McDade; permanent	1189–1199, Sherwood Forest; under the reign of Richard the Lion-Hearted; some fantasy elements;	2010	25 acres, camping and clan camping	(02b) early March–late April (8 weekends)	137k (2022)	100 permanent buildings including a complete castle Sherwood Forest Faire
Shrewsbury Renaissance Faire	Oregon	Kings Valley;	1558-1603; elements of Shakespeare and Elizabeth I	1996	5 stages; parking; no pets	(09b) mid-September (one weekend)	unk	Shrewsbury Renaissance Faire
Siouxland Renaissance Festival	South Dakota	W.H. Lyon Fairgrounds, Sioux Falls	1575 Town of Shrewsbury, England, the 17th year of Queen Elizabeth's reign	2001	6 stages, parking, camping	(06a) First Weekend of June	-5k	Siouxland Festival
Escondido Renaissance Faire	California	Felicita County Park, Escondido, California;	The Shire of Escondido; Her Majesty, Queen "Elizabeth Gloriana"	2000	stages; 53 acres	(04d) April–May (Spring Faire; 2 weekends) (10d) October–November (Fall Faire; 2 weekends)	5k	Old Tyme Productions
Sterling Renaissance Festival	New York	Sterling; permanent	The fictional Village of Warwick; 1585 England	1976	12 stages; 35+ acres; camping acres	(07a) July–August (7 weekends)	100k (2019)	Sterling, NY Festival
Sparta NJ Renaissance Festival	New Jersey	Camp Sacajawea, Sparta; permanent	late-medevial/early Renaissance English village	2017	6 stages; 50+ acres	(08d) early to mid-September (3 weekends)		Sparta NJ Renaissance Restival
Tennessee Renaissance Festival	Tennessee	Arrington-Triune; permanent	16th-century town of "Covington Glen;" features a full-sized replica "border castle", known as "Castell Gwynn"	1985	stages; 68 acres	(05a) May (4 weekends)	45k (2008)	Tennessee RenFest
Texas Renaissance Festival	Texas	Todd Mission; permanent	The King's "New Market Village;" 3rd–16th century; Roman, Scots, Celts, pirates, fantasy	1974	25 stages; 55 fair acres; 200+ camping acres; parking;	(10a) October–Thanksgiving weekend (9 weekends)	679k (2016)	Largest US RenFaire by attendance TRF
Three Barons Renaissance Faire	Alaska	3400 East Tudor Rd, Anchorage; recurring event	The three barons' Italian, Arabic, and English camps at Hillshire Village; pirates, fantasy	1992	stages; free parking shuttle	(06a) first two weekends in June	unk	3 Barons
Utah Renaissance Festival and Fantasy Faire	Utah	Marriott-Slaterville; semi-permanent	1500–1650 in medieval Village of Hawkhurst; some fantasy elements	2006	52 acres	(05a) May (4 weekends)	25k (2011)	Utah RenFest
Valhalla Renaissance Faire	California	Camp Richardson, South Lake Tahoe; semi-permanent	1580 Elizabethan England; nobility, pirates, barbarians	1993	3 stages; 7 acres	(05d) Memorial day weekend–mid-June (4 weekends)	49k (2010)	ValhallaFaire
Vermont Renaissance Faire	Vermont	Champlain Valley Expo, Essex; semi-permanent	Unknown location; Renaissance, Fantasy, Medieval	2016	6 stages, demo field, joust field, multiple encampments	(06d) end of June (1 weekend)	10k	Vermont Gatherings
Virginia Renaissance Faire	Virginia	Spotsylvania; semi-permanent	Elizabethan village of "Stafford" in the 1580s; pirates, Celts; inventors	2002	stages; No pets;	(05c) mid-May–mid-June (4 weekends)	20k (2014)	Virginia Renaissance Faire
Washington Midsummer Renaissance Faire	Washington	Sky Meadows Farm, Snohomish; recurring	The 1577 village of "Merriwick", Elizabethan England; pirates, carnival, fantasy elements	2010	6 stages; joust arena; 2 pubs; parking; camping; no pets;	(07d) Mid-July–late-August (5 weekends)	45k (2015)	Midsummer Faire
West Virginia Renaissance Festival	West Virginia	Hollow Hills Farm, Lewisburg; permanent site	The Village of Essex; broadly renaissance with fantasy elements	2018	6 stages; 15 acres;	(06a) Four weekends in June	unk	West Virginia Renaissance Festival
Ye Merrie Greenwood Renaissance Faire	Oregon	Glastonbury Faire in Toledo, Oregon	Elizabethan/Shakespearean Era, circa 1585	1989	8 stages	(09b) mid-September	5k (2016)	Ye Merrie Greenwood Players

Table Key:
† Permanent = majority of venue comprises permanent, outdoor, purpose-built structures in a stable site; Semi-permanent = outdoor event occurs regularly at stable public or private venue (e.g.: public parks; private farms, etc.) and features some permanent purpose-built structures; Recurring Event = event occurs regularly at stable public or private venue (e.g.: public parks; private farms, etc.) but with no purpose-built structures; any event with temporary structures only (tents, portable stages, etc.) or held at indoor venue.
≠Attendance figure is referenced

=== Canada ===
Most Canadian events are only one weekend in duration. Those notable and older than 10 years are listed here.

Name	Location	Setting	Year opened	Area	Season	Average seasonal attendance	Reference / external link
Robin in the Hood	Gibson Park, Elmira, Ontario (semi-permanent)	Fictional Elmira; King Richard, Prince John, and Robin Hood	2001		Mid-May (one weekend)	Two stages; pets allowed	Robin in the Hood Medieval Festival
Montreal Medieval Fair (Salon de la Passion Medievale)	Centre Pierre Charbonneau, Montreal, Quebec		2001	(recurring semi-permanent)	Early May (one weekend)		Salon Medieval
Oxford Renaissance Festival	Dorchester Fairgrounds, 4939 Hamilton Rd, Dorchester, Ontario: ON N0L 1G6	Village of Wolvercote in the 1560s.	2013	6 stages, indoor pub. Free parking, open rain or shine	One weekend near the end of June		Oxford Renaissance Festival
Cooks Creek Medieval Festival	Church of the Immaculate Conception, Cooks Creek, Manitoba		2004		End of July (every even year)		Cooks Creek Medieval Festival
Feste Médiévale de Saint-Marcellin	Saint-Marcellin Quebec 5 Rte de l'Église, Saint-Marcellin, QC G0K 1R0	Medieval and Viking	2003		One week-end Mid august		https://www.festemedievale.net/

== Australia and New Zealand ==
Most Australian events are only one or two days in duration. Notable Renaissance and Medieval events (older than 10 years) are listed here.

Name	Location	Setting	Year opened	Area	Season	Average seasonal attendance	Reference / external link
Abbey Tournament and Medieval Festival	Abbey Museum, Brisbane, Australia	600 – 1600 AD; authentic	1990		late June – early July	37,000 (season)	Tournament
Balingup Medieval Carnivale	Balingup, Western Australia, Australia	"Balingup Village"	1996		late August		Balingup MedFest

== South Africa ==
Name	Location	Setting	Year opened	Area	Season	Annual attendance	Reference / external link
Magical Medieval Fayre	La Vue Lodge, Nietgedacht, South Africa	Fictional land of Moordoor			First Saturday in June		Medieval Fayre, various coverage

== Europe ==
=== United Kingdom ===
Name	Location	Setting	Year opened	Area	Season	Average seasonal attendance	Reference / external link
Wyldwood RenFest	Redcar, England	Historic Medieval/Arthurian; Many Reenactments, educational shows and fantasy elements	2026	Kirkleatham Showground	May	10,000	Wyldwood Renfest
Fantasy Forest	Hatfield, England	Fantasy, Medieval	2019	Hatfield House	July and September	19,000 (2025 season)	Fantasy Forest
Jorvik Viking Festival	York, England	Viking town of "Jorvik" in 948 AD	1984	At the site of old Viking settlement of Jorvik	mid-January and mid-February	40,000 (2011 season)	Viking Fest
Tewkesbury Medieval Festival	Tewkesbury, Gloucestershire, England		1984	Recreates 1471 Battle of Tewkesbury	Second full weekend in July		Tewkesbury Medieval Festival
England's Medieval Festival	Herstmonceux Castle, Sussex, England		1993		July		

=== Italy ===
Name	Location	Setting	Year opened	Area	Season	Average seasonal attendance	Reference / external link
European Renaissance and Carnival of Venice (Festival Europeo di Rievocazioni Storiche)	Venice, Italy	Historic "Venezia" in the Middle Ages; many fantasy elements as it is also part of the Carnival of Venice	1979	at the Piazza San Marco	February		
European Renaissance of Candela	Candela, Italy		2013	at piazzetta	May		
Federicus	Altamura, Italy	The king Frederick II visits the city with his entourage	2012	Historic city center	last weekend of April (three days)		Federicus
Montelago Celtic Festival (Il Festival di Montelago)	Marche, Serravalle di Chienti, Italy	Late Middle Ages fantasy Celtic villages, lectures and games	2002	Upland of Taverne, Serravalle, Macerata	First weekend of August		Montelago Celtic Festival website
Torneo dei Quartieri	Gubbio, Italy	A crossbow tournament with medieval costume parades in the 4 quartieri, followed by a celebration in Piazza Grande.	1973	City centre	14 August		Torneo dei Quartieri

=== Germany ===
Name	Location	Setting	Year opened	Area	Season	Average seasonal attendance	Reference / external link
Horber Ritterspiele (Knights games of Horb am Neckar)	Horb am Neckar, Germany	Knights tournament, camp life, medieval market		Historic city center, next to the river	June		ritterspiele.info
Kaltenberger Ritterturnier	Kaltenberg Castle, Geltendorf, Bavaria, Germany	14th-century medieval marketplace; authentic	1980	Throughout the castle grounds	early – late July	120,000 (2010 season)	Ritterturnier
Ritterfestspiele Bad Bentheim (Knight Games of Bad Bentheim)	Bentheim Castle, Bad Bentheim, Lower Saxony Germany	Knights tournament, camp life, craftsmen, demonstrations, market	2006	Castle Garden underneath the castle	April/May	Bad Bentheim Ritterfestspiele	

=== Elsewhere in Europe ===
Name	Location	Setting	Year opened	Area	Season	Average seasonal attendance	Reference / external link
Horsens Medieval Festival	Horsens, Denmark	Wooden taverns, mediaeval markets, chivalry, horses, renaissance events, and fantasy	1992	Around and within the largest prison museum in the world, 'Horsens Prison Museum'	late August	60,000	Middel Alder Festival
Centre de l'Imaginaire Arthurien	Rennes, Brittany, France		1988				
Castlefest	Lisse, Netherlands	Medieval scenes, games and more, related to renaissance and fantasy	2005	Throughout the castle grounds of castle Keukenhof	First weekend of August	55,000	http://castlefest.nl/
Medieval Market of Turku	City of Turku, Finland	A medieval marketplace in the 14th and 15th centuries	1996	Old Great Square	late June	100,000 (2005 season)	Medieval Market
Medieval Rose Festival	Rhodes, Greece	It is 1309 through 1523 AD on the "Island of Rhodos"; some fantasy elements	2005		late May – early July		Medieval Rhodes
Medieval Week on Gotland	Visby, Gotland Island, Sweden	1361 AD in the Middle Ages market town of "Visby"; authentic	1984	The entire island	early – mid-August		Medeltidsveckan
Santa Maria Medieval Journey (Viagem Medieval em Terra de Santa Maria)	Santa Maria da Feira, Aveiro, Portugal	The early 15th century in the village of "Feira" marketplace and castle; authentic		In the Feira castle and surrounding city streets	late July – early August		Santa Maria Feira Medieval
Duke John's Festival (Hertug Hans Festival)	Haderslev, South Jutland, Denmark	Duke John II's reign in Haderslev, and the bringing of reformation to Denmark		The town center of Haderslev	early June		Homepage
Renesansni festival Koprivnica (Renaissance fair Koprivnica)	Koprivnica, Croatia	4-day historical mega spectacle Renaissance Festival kerning late medieval historical facts and originality of Koprivnica, Drava and the Croatian cultural heritage values	2005	Koprivnica fortress walls	late August	50,000	Renesanski festival Koprivnica
Zeitreise ins Mittelalter Eggenburg	Eggenburg, Austria	Cultural medieval festival; yearly changing topic (2015: The Reception of the Middle Ages; 2016: Myths and Legends; 2017: The 500 Anniversary of the Reformation)	1995	In the historic center of Eggenburg	Second weekend of September	30,000	Zeitreise ins Mittelalter Eggenburg
Bitwa pod Grunwaldem (Battle of Grunwald)	Stębark, Poland	Cultural medieval festival with the main theme of the battle of Grunwald in 1410. The main event is the staging of the battle	1998	Fields of Grunwald near the village of Stębark	Around 10 July		Bitwa pod Grunwaldem

== See also ==
- List of open-air and living history museums
- List of open air and living history museums in the United States
- List of tourist attractions worldwide
- Medieval Times
- Medieval Faire (Canada's Wonderland)
