= England's Medieval Festival =

Festival in the United Kingdom

Coordinates: 50°52′10″N 0°20′19″E

- Genre: Festival
- Frequency: Yearly
- Locations: The King's Grove, Nutley, East Sussex
- Country: United Kingdom
- Established: 1993
- Most recent: August 24, 2024; 2 years ago
- Next event: August 23, 2025; 14 months ago
- Website: www.englandsmedievalfestival.com

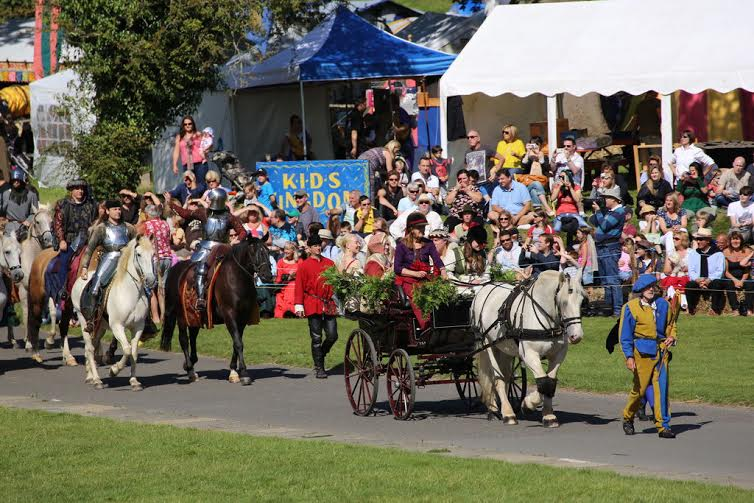
Grand Parade

England's Medieval Festival is a medieval-themed festival held over the August bank holiday at The King's Grove, Pippingford Park in Sussex, England. Held over three days, the festival features jousting, falconry, knights battles, medieval camping, traditional and modern folk music, medieval banqueting, re-enactments, battles, horses, theatre, crafts, workshops, shopping, medieval food, drink and real ale.

The first medieval festival was held at Herstmonceux Castle in 1993 as a celebration of the new ownership by Queen's University, and received several hundred guests. Later festivals have been attended by audiences of several thousand.

England's Medieval Festival celebrated its 25th anniversary in 2017 supported by local and national societies including The Archers of Herstmonceux Castle, the Medieval Siege Society re-enactment group, Sussex Falconry and the Pentacle Drummers.

In 2022, the Festival was cancelled due to the Castle's owners withdrawing permission for its use.

In 2023, the festival returned at a new location of The Kings Grove, Pippingford Park, Nutley.

== See also ==
- Renaissance fair
- List of Renaissance and Medieval fairs
