= 1940s World War II Era Ball =

- Status: Active
- Genre: Historical reenactment ball
- Frequency: Annually
- Venue: Boulder Airport
- Location: Boulder, Colorado
- Country: United States
- Years active: 2008–present
- Founder: T. Khyentse James
- Website: www.1940sball.org

1940s World War II Era Ball is an annual historical reenactment event in Boulder, Colorado. The event is a ball, which features swing music from the 1940s and impersonators of musicians and entertainers such as Bob Hope, Frank Sinatra, Marilyn Monroe, Judy Garland and the Andrews Sisters. The ball is held in a hangar at the Boulder Airport and features World War II-era airplanes including C-45 Expeditors and B-25 Mitchells. The ball also holds an annual 1940s White Christmas Ball. Net proceeds from the event are donated to local charities including those that support World War II veterans and the preservation of aviation history.

The 1940s World War II Era Ball was first held in 2008. The ball was founded by Khyentse James, who previously founded the Decibelle Music and Culture Festival. The ball was created in honor of James' grandparents, who were radio performers and met while they were working at a radio station together in the 1940s.

In 2016, the ball expanded to two nights for its ninth annual event. The theme was "Our Troops Bring Home Paradise: A Tiki Explosion" and included car shows, film screenings and other events.
