= Carolina Renaissance Festival =

Festival held annually in North Carolina, USA

Coordinates: 35.429°N 80.770°W

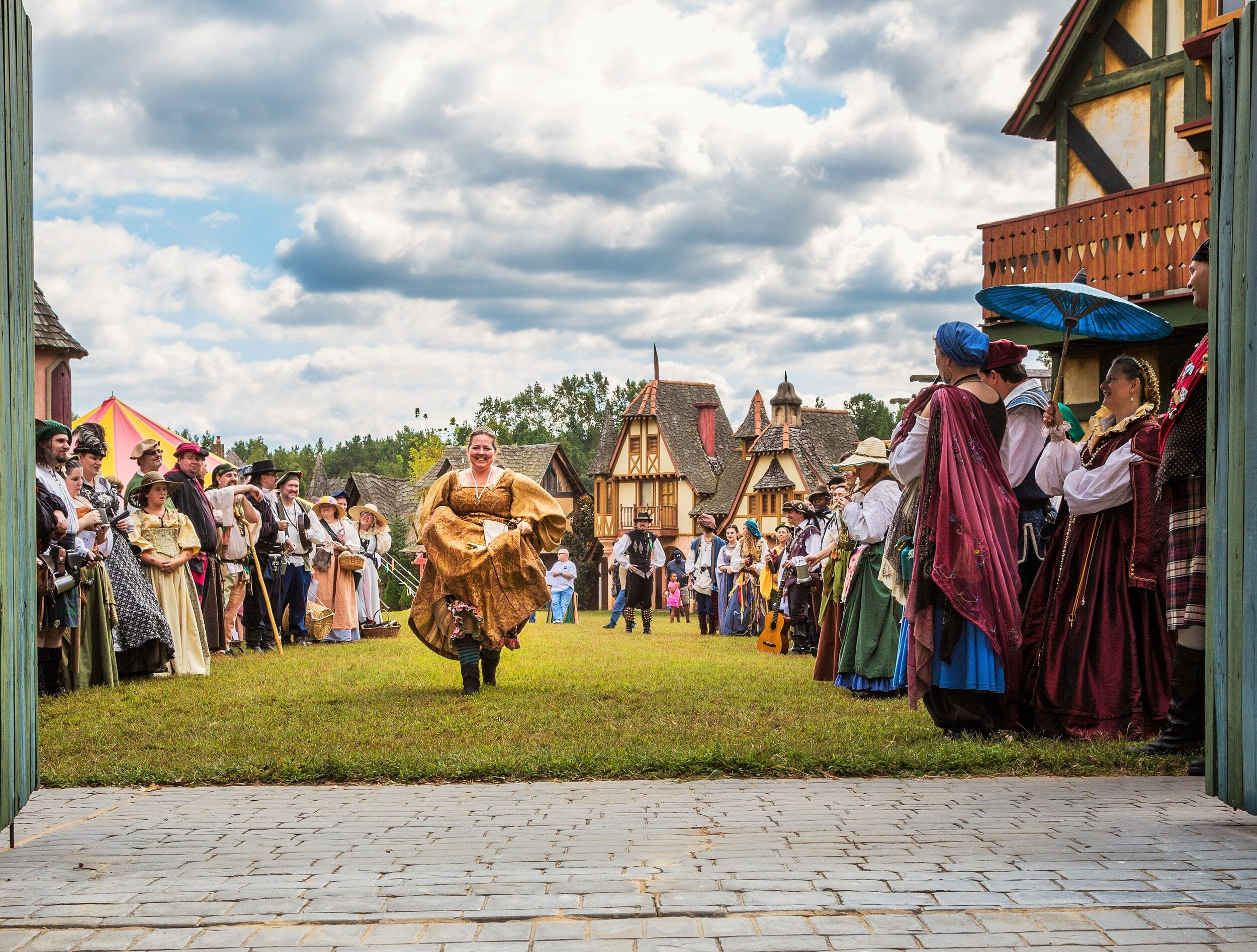
- Carolina Renaissance Festival
- Genre: Renaissance fair
- Dates: October – November
- Locations: Huntersville, North Carolina, United States
- Inaugurated: 1994
- Attendance: 230,000 (average)
- Stages: 16
- Website: www.carolina.renfestinfo.com

The Carolina Renaissance Festival is a 25 acre renaissance themed amusement park. The festival is set in a fictional storybook village of "Fairhaven". The open air village and artisan marketplace contain cottages and bungalows based on 16th century European architecture. Sixteen outdoor stages are used for comedy theater, dance, and circus-like entertainments. Featured, live-action shows include knights on horseback (who joust three times daily); presentations of the art of falconry; and live swimming mermaids. The festival is held annually on Saturdays and Sundays in October and November. An average of 230,000 visitors a year attend the festival during its Fall season.

== History ==
The Carolina Renaissance Festival was founded in 1994 by Jeff Siegel, owner of Royal Faires, Ltd., the parent company. Royal Faires also owns and operates the Arizona Renaissance Festival. The Carolina Renaissance Festival features a 25 acre European inspired village nestled within 300 acres (120 ha) of land located just north of Charlotte, North Carolina, between the towns of Huntersville and Concord. It is one of the largest—by acreage—Renaissance fairs in America.

== Acts and attractions ==
Carolina Renaissance Festival village is brought to life by stage shows that feature live music, dance, comedy shows, and performers with circus variety skills such as juggling, aerial skills, acrobatics, and sideshow antics. Musicians perform with traditional instruments such as the harp, bagpipes, and other obscure "period" instruments. Roaming the lanes of the festival are a variety of traveling street performers who engage visitors in interactive performance experiences. An in-house performance company that features over 100 costumed characters that interact directly with visitors at the fair creates an authentic feel of the renaissance-era town. Professional and amateur actors and costume-play hobbyist help bring the "village" to life. Individuals in the company have developed unique characters such as the "Village Baker," the "Tavern Keeper," the village "Lord Mayor," and a fictional Royal family that has come to visit Fairhaven. The participants in the company are primarily people from surrounding communities, including Concord, Greensboro, Raleigh, and Charlotte.

=== Major attractions ===
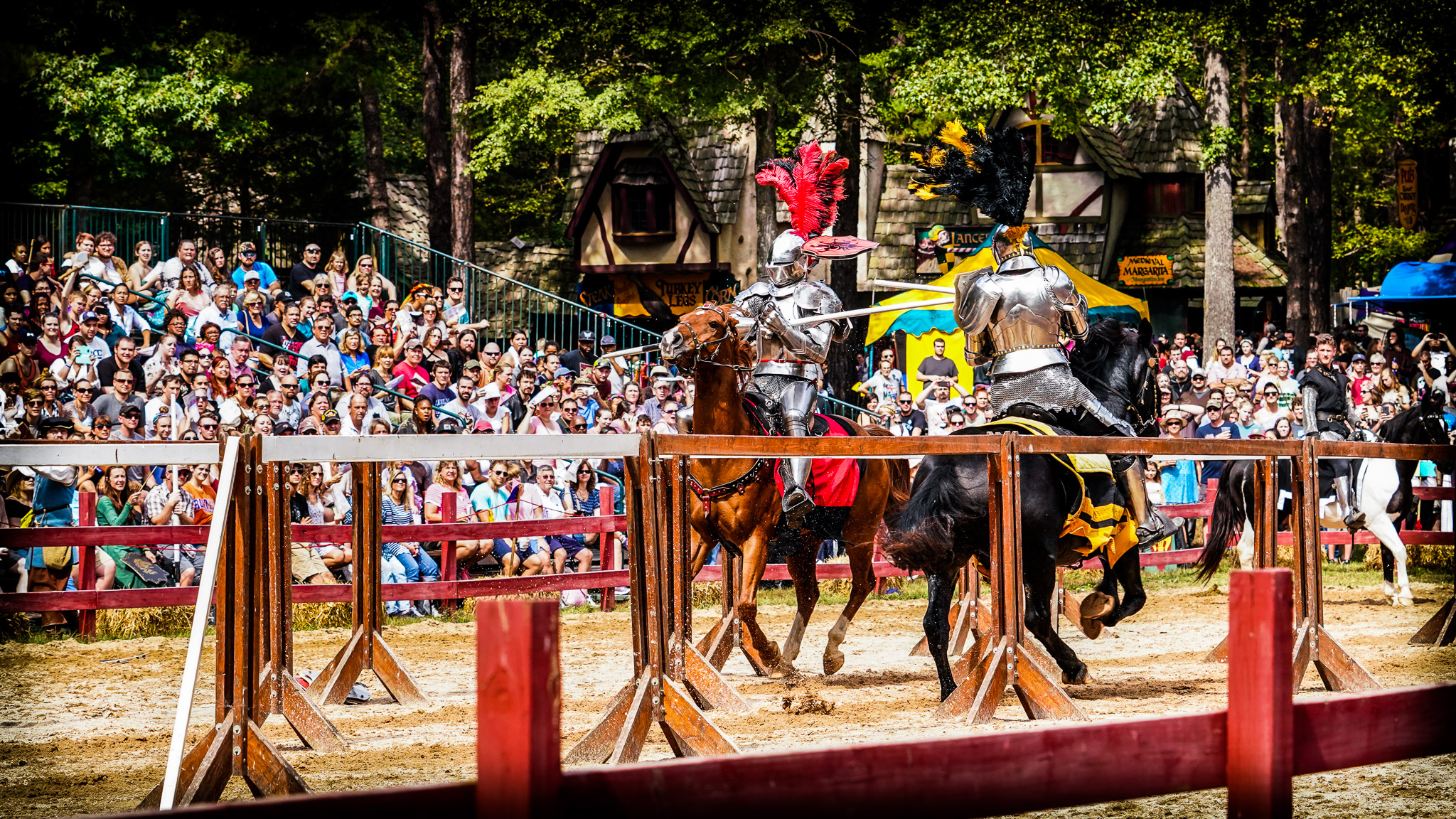
Jousting Knights at the Queen's Tournament Arena

In addition to 16 stages of rotating, scheduled entertainers, there are three premier attractions: The jousting knights on horseback; the falconry demonstration; and the "Sea Fairies" mermaid exhibit.

Jousting

The jousts are enacted by performers from Aventail Productions; and the competition is judged with points that are awarded using a historically accurate scoring system. The victory is awarded to the true winners of each competition. The final joust of the day ends with a conflict settled by an unhorsing and ground fight to the "death".

Falconry

A variety of birds-of-prey are put on display highlighting their unique abilities and training that enraptured nobles long ago and made falconry the 'sport of kings.'

Mermaids

The Sea Fairies exhibit features mermaids swimming in a 3,000 gallon aquarium tank. Near the tank is a Mermaid sitting on a throne where children can have their photos taken.

== Retail sales and services ==
Over 140 vendors sell a variety of handmade arts and craft goods such as artisan jewelry and leather goods, blown glass (made during live demonstrations), candles, and custom chain mail. The festival vends an assortment of medieval themed foods, including: giant turkey legs, savory soups, stews, and chowders (served in "bread bowls"), "Steak on a Stake", fish and chips, corn on the cob, and Scotch eggs. The site also features games such as archery target-shooting, crossbow shooting, axe throwing, frog catapults, and a gold coin hunt.

== Special events ==
Weddings and vow-renewal ceremonies are attended by the cast of the Royal Court and take place in a covered pavilion reserved for the event.

The festival has themed weekends throughout the course of the season. Themes include: "Time Travelers Weekend" where costume players of all genres (science fiction, comic books, etc.) are invited to time travel to the renaissance; "BrewFest" weekend, "Halloween Daze & Spooky Knights" weekend, and "Pirate's Christmas" weekend.

== See also ==
- List of Renaissance and Medieval fairs
- Historical reenactment
