= Wicked Winter Renaissance Faire =

- Genre: Renaissance fair
- Dates: February
- Frequency: Yearly
- Location: New Jersey
- Coordinates: 40.32392°N 74.64431°W
- Country: United States
- Inaugurated: 2006
- Founder: Jeff Mach
- Most recent: 2018

The Wicked Winter Renaissance Faire, which ran for 3 days every February from 2006 to 2016 (and a reborn event in 2018), was a yearly adult-themed fair with programming geared towards ages 16 and up. It was founded by Jeff Mach.

== Description ==
The Wicked Winter Renaissance Faire was an indoor renaissance festival for ages 16 and up. The event started with Renaissance-themed programming, but later expanded to include additional themes including Steampunk, Gothic, Burlesque shows, Pirates, Ninjas, Fairtales, and Villans. An adult section was also added in the early years.

== History ==
Wicked Faire was an event organized by Widdershins, LLC DBA Wicked Events by Jeff Mach. The first Wicked Faire was held in February 2006 at the New Jersey Convention and Expo Center.

In 2013, the Wicked Winter Renaissance Faire was the largest indoor Renaissance Faire in the world.

The 2016 edition of the Wicked Winter Renaissance Faire was announced to be the last one, founder Jeff Mach explaining that the Faire reached maturity and that the event had lost its novelty spark.

In 2017, Jeff Mach launched the Glimmerdark festival in Princeton, which was presented as the successor of the Wicked Winter Renaissance Faire. Jeff Mach said the Glimmerdark festival retained the best elements of the Wicked Winter Renaissance Faire.

Tammy Shipps, president of Silver Phoenix, purchased the intellectual rights of the Wicked Winter Renaissance Faire on 13 March 2018 and renamed JME from Jeff Mach Events to Just Magical Events. Wicked Faire 2018 was funded by a buyout from Turtle Hill Events.

== Controversy ==
In 2018, allegations of exploitation, harassment, falling through on financial agreements and sexual misconduct by founder Jeff Mach were posted by vendors, volunteers, employees, event guests, and partners on social media and gathered on an anonymous Blogspot called Owl Eye View and in the Daily Beast. Assertions included a description of one woman being forced to take sleeping medication, consent violations, offering of sexual favors, and BDSM practices without clear consent. In response, Jeff Mach stepped down from hosting events, and Jeff Mach Events was renamed Just Magical Events. As of 2023 Just Magical Events has returned to hosting events under the name Jeff Mach Events and is currently run by Jeff Mach.
