= Estrojam's Decibelle Music and Culture Festival =

Decibelle (formerly Estrojam) is a 501c3 NFP music and culture festival that promotes equality and was established in 2003. Past headliners have included, Wanda Jackson (First Lady of Rock who toured with Elvis in the 1950s and 1960s), Nina Hagen, Concrete Blonde, Cat Power, The Gossip, Peaches, Amy Ray of the Indigo Girls and Margaret Cho. The hip hop, post punk, disco, and dance-punk band ESG played their final show on Friday, September 21, 2007, at Chicago's Abbey Pub, during the Decibelle festival.

In 2006, Decibelle was featured in the Chicago Historical Society's "History of Women's Music" event. In 2008, Decibelle founder T. Khyentse James was awarded the "Outstanding Community Leader" Award from the National Organization for Women (Chicago) for Decibelle's work.

Decibelle has also presented workshops in healthcare, finance, entertainment business, do-it-yourself car maintenance, independent publishing and donates proceeds to beneficiaries that promote social change, human rights, non-violence and cultural arts. Past beneficiaries have included Burma's Shan Women's Action Network, National Organization for Women and Girls Rock Chicago. In 2006, a rock band of 12-year-old girls from the Chicago Girls Rock Camp opened for 1970s punk artist Nina Hagen. In 2005, The Shan Women's Action Network and the US Campaign for Burma spoke on stage about their efforts to end brutality against women in Burma.

== Past Estrojam/Decibelle artists ==
- Peaches
- Cat Power
- Margaret Cho
- Concrete Blonde
- Wanda Jackson
- Nina Hagen
- Amy Ray of the Indigo Girls
- The Gossip
- ESG's last show
- Thurston Moore
- Anne Waldman
- MEN (JD and Jo of Le Tigre)
- Team Dresch
- Miss Kittin
- Leslie and the Ly's
- The Brazilian Girls
- Bahamadia
- Ice Cream Socialites
- Michelle Tea
- Lady Tigra
- Pretty Girls Make Graves
- Sharon Jones & The Dap-Kings
- All Girl Summer Fun Band
- Capsula
- Northern State
- Kaki King
- The Reputation
- Kinnie Starr
- Theo from the Lunachicks
- Cynthia Plaster Caster
- Staceyann Chin
- Princess Superstar
- Laura Love
- Bitch and Animal
- Ubaka Hill
- Three Dollar Bill
- National B-Girl Break Dancing Battle
