= Alabama Renaissance Faire =

Fair held annually in downtown Florence, Alabama

- Genre: Renaissance faire
- Dates: October
- Locations: Florence, Alabama, United States 34°48′11″N 87°40′31″W
- Inaugurated: 1987
- Attendance: 30,000 - 40,000 (average)
- Website: www.thealrenfaire.org

The Alabama Renaissance Faire is a Renaissance faire held annually in downtown Florence, Alabama on the fourth full weekend in October each year.

== History ==
The Alabama Renaissance Faire was created in 1987 by a group of educators and city leaders meeting over the summer. The proposed fairs' purpose was twofold: ..."1) to create a festival that would occur during the school year; and 2) to make sure that the event would include as many subjects within the area schools’ curricular offerings as possible..." Because the city of Florence, Italy was one of the centers of the historic Renaissance period — as well as the city's namesake — the organizers thought that would be the perfect theme for their education-focused fair. They held the first small fair that October. The Alabama Renaissance Faire has been a celebration of Florence's "Renaissance City" identity since then. The following year, the state of Alabama's senate and house passed a bill that designated Florence as the state's official renaissance fair city.

== Details ==
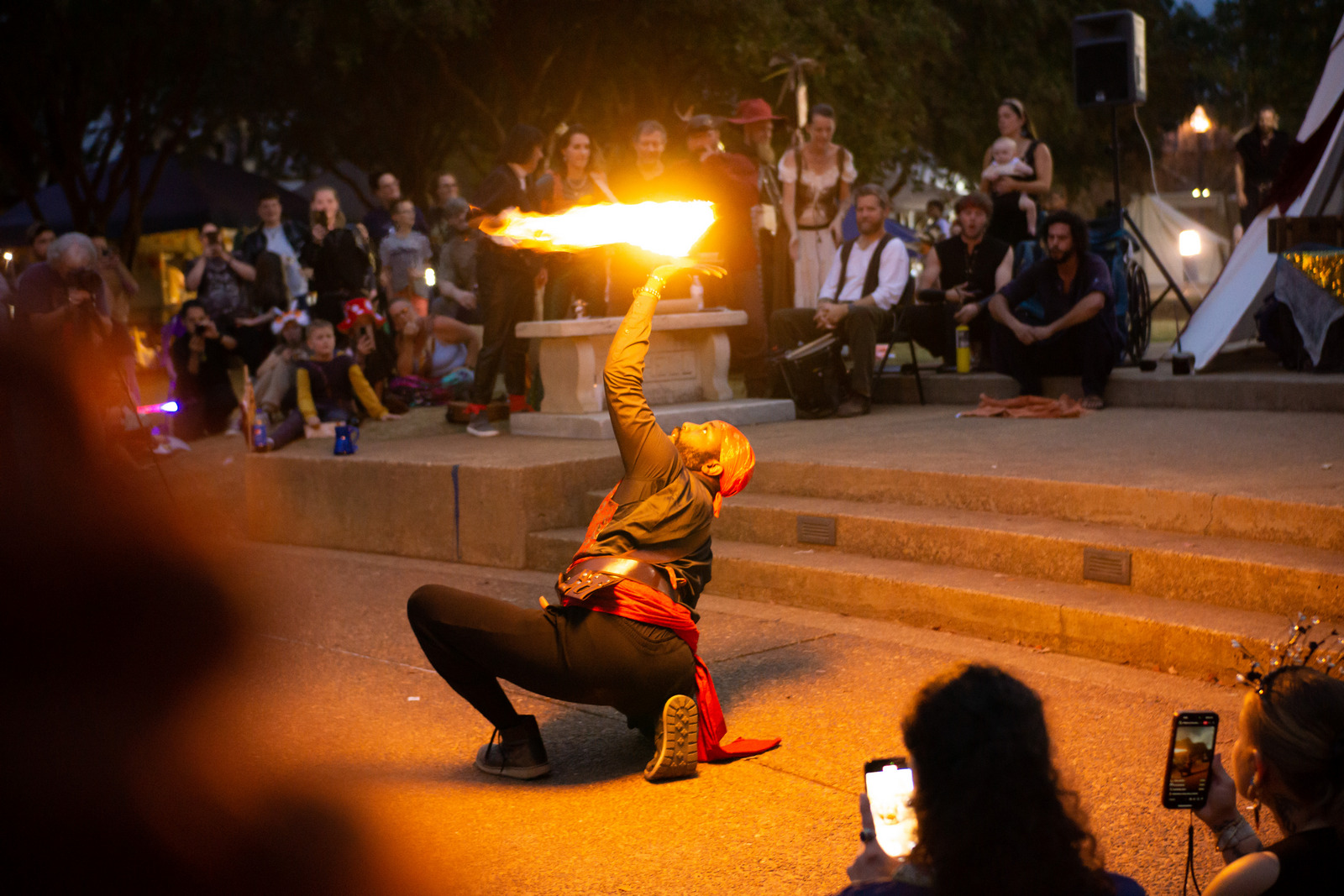
A performer closing out the day with a fire act.

The Faire is held in the city's Wilson Park, renamed 'Fountain-on-the-Green' for the event, and averages between 30,000 and 40,000 participants every year. Elements of the faire and activities that take place during the faire have expanded from the original plans. They now include various entertainers such as fire spinners and bellydancers, historical combat reenactments, historical craft demonstrations, food, beverage, and handmade artisan craft vendors, a student art contest, chess tournament, stage shows, and musical performances. The faire takes place yearly on the fourth weekend in October.

The Alabama Renaissance Faire is run by a non-profit, all volunteer, group known as the "Roundtable." There are no admission fees to the public to attend the fair. The Faire is unique in that the event's figurehead, or 'Monarch,' rotates every year and is decided by "The Choosing" ceremony at the Renaissance Feast that precedes the faire by one week; a coin is hidden in a cookie and anyone at the feast can join the ceremony to try to get the coin which will make them The next ruler of The faire's fictional kingdom of Firenzè. The monarch performs as the character they've created (which is approved by the Roundtable) and makes appearances at the feast and faire. Reigning for one year per the faire's story that the throne of Firenzè is cursed, each monarch is crowned on the Sunday afternoon at the end of the former monarch'a reign the same year they win the coin at the Feast. Each monarch will reign for one year then leave the throne through an event of their choosing which explains how the curse made them lose the throne. Examples of former monarch's exits include being dragged off for witchcraft, running away to the fairie realm, failing to break the curse and resigning, and simply leaving a note with the crown stating "I quit" followed by a list of grievances toward the herald and court.

No faire was held in 2020 due to the COVID-19 pandemic, however a virtual faire was created to keep the spirit of the long-running, beloved festival alive during the global crisis the faire would come to refer to as "the plague".

== See also ==
- List of Renaissance fairs
