= Kentucky Highland Renaissance Festival =

Coordinates: 38.3646°N 85.1599°W

The Highland Renaissance Festival is a permanent Renaissance Festival located on former farmland in Eminence, Kentucky and set in the fictional early 14th century village of Briarwood in the Highlands of Scotland in the time when Robert the Bruce ruled. The year 1320, to be exact. It is in the center of a triangle created by the cities of Louisville, Lexington, and Cincinnati, and is the first permanent renaissance festival in the state of Kentucky.

== Features ==
The festival features vendors and artisans who offer an assortment of hand-crafted items. A cast of actors portray life as it would have been during this time. These include:

- The Briarwood Players (The King's Guild)
- The Faewood Grove (The Faerie Guild)
- and The Clan Balaur (The Traveler's Guild).

Stage entertainment includes a mud show, armored jousting, a circus-style sideshow (The Pickled Brothers), Fae Lore and faerie tales, and musicians performing historical and original songs. Throughout the festival there are family-oriented activities such as craft demonstrations, human-powered rides, and games. Maekala's Inn, HooDoo's Pub, and The Twisted Thistle (The 21+ Pub) provide food, drinks, and continuous shows. Attendance in 2007 averaged over 1000 people a day. This year completed 21 years.

The land is also used for other events during the year, such as a Celtic Fest and Highlands Games in late September and a Dickens Festival in December.

== See also ==
- List of Renaissance fairs
- Historical reenactment
- Jousting
- Society for Creative Anachronism
- List of open air and living history museums in the United States
