= Midsummer Fantasy Renaissance Faire =

Annual renaissance faire in Ansonia, Connecticut

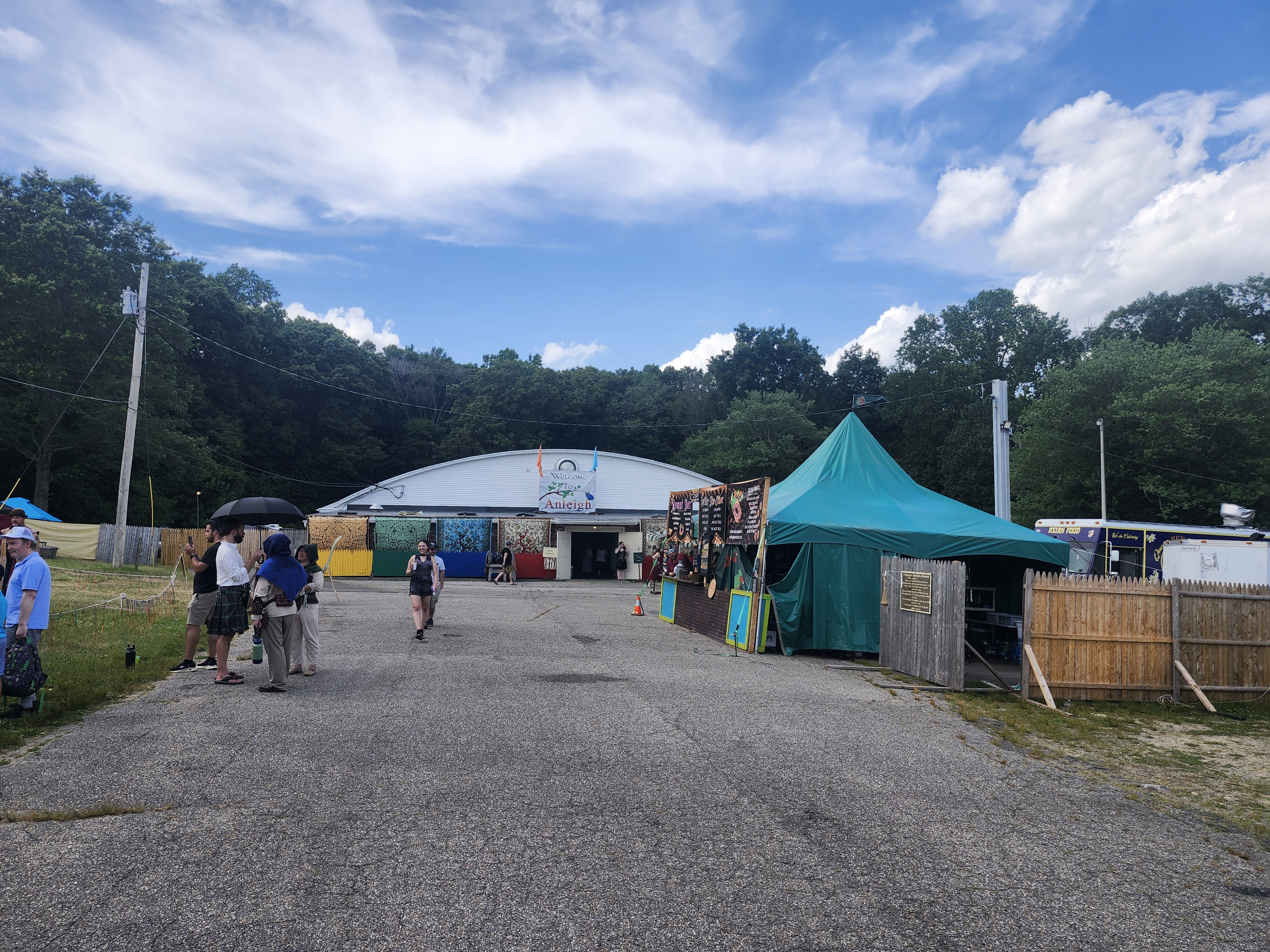
- Main pavilion at the Midsummer Fantasy Renaissance Faire
- Genre: Renaissance fair
- Date: June - July
- Venue: Warsaw Park
- Location: Ansonia, Connecticut
- Coordinates: 41.3303267°N 73.0500044°W
- Inaugurated: 2011
- Founder: Daniel GreenWolf
- Website: https://www.mfrenfaire.com/

The Midsummer Fantasy Renaissance Faire is an annual renaissance faire held at Warsaw Park in Ansonia, Connecticut. The event happens in late June to early July on weekends.

== History ==
The Midsummer was co-founded by Daniel GreenWolf in 2011.

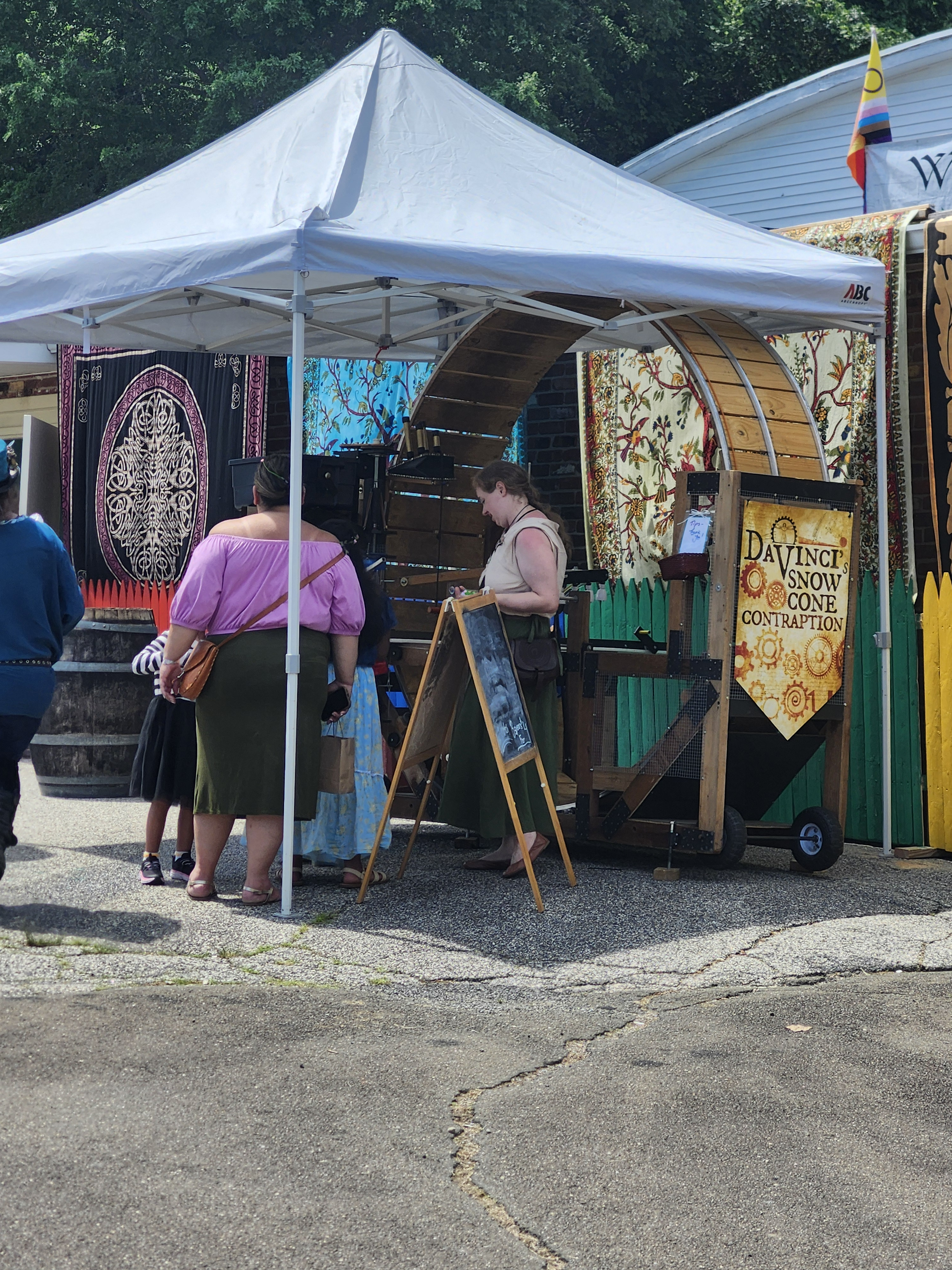
Human sized hamster wheel used at the Midsummer Fantasy Renaissance Faire

In 2024, GreenWolf introduced a human sized hamster wheel. The wheel crushes ice into a cup when someone walks in it, after which people have to turn a crank to make the ice move down the conveyor belt. Once the ice is at the end of the conveyor, people then chose a flavor for their slushie. GreenWolf said he was inspired when he was performing as a magician and saw similar hamster wheels in being used Eastern and Southern regions of the United States.

== Setting and plot ==
The Midsummer Fantasy Renaissance Faire is set in the fictional Kingdom of Cuulayne. Midsummer has a different story every year, the 13th faire in particular followed a "Call of the Vanguard" story, where a warrior goes on a quest to join a group that protects mages.

== Attractions ==
People at Midsummer can watch flaming jugglers, music shows, magic shows, and live combat. There are also several food and artisan vendors, the latter selling both fantasy and historically themed items. There is an onsite Proving Ground, where people can participate in axe throwing, archery, and knife throwing activities.

As of 2018, there are more than 100 in-costume characters at Midsummer.
