= Louisiana Renaissance Festival =

Renaissance fair near Hammond, Louisiana

Coordinates: 30.5304°N 90.3746°W

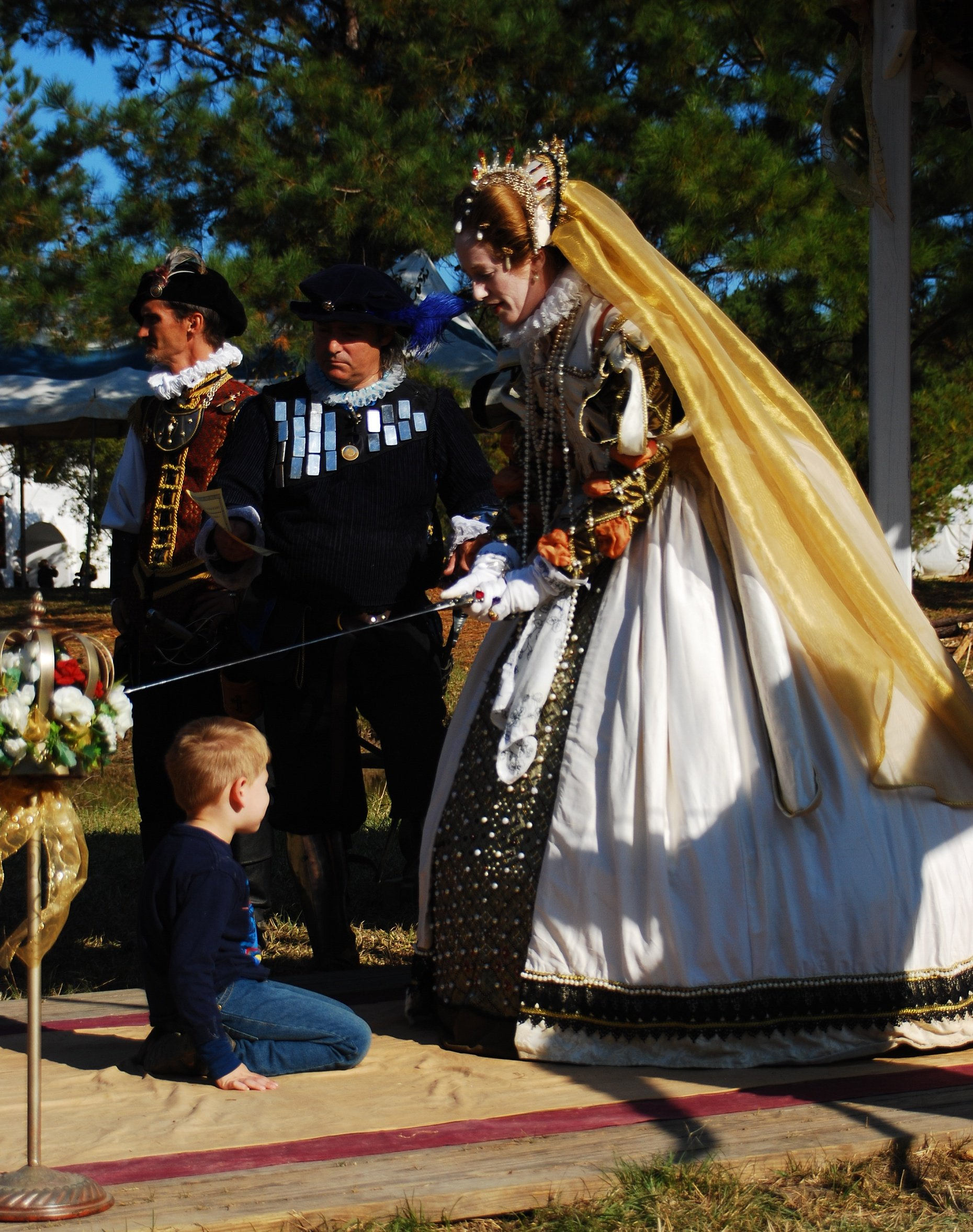
- An actress (Kimberly Stockton), playing Queen Elizabeth I, knights a young visitor
- Genre: Renaissance fair
- Dates: November - December
- Locations: Robert, Louisiana
- Inaugurated: 2000
- Attendance: 25,000 (average)
- Stages: 7
- Website: www.larf.org

The Louisiana Renaissance Festival (abbreviated LARF) is a renaissance fair near Hammond, Louisiana. The festival takes place on a location that emulates a historical 16th century village (Albright) in England during the 1565 fall harvest festival. The Louisiana Renaissance Festival started in 2000 and explores Subcultural movements in Renaissance art, crafts, music, and theatre. Cast members are dressed as people would have been dressed during the 1560s.

The local cast at LARF is composed of enthusiasts from all over southeast Louisiana. The cast members regularly interact with the patrons of the fair and have been known to try to marry them, dance with them, bring patrons into random shows, and other mischief. The cast members dress in renaissance inspired clothing. Female cast members wear an underskirt or petticoat with an outer skirt and accessories such as collars. Male cast members wear knee length trousers, stockings, and a shirt.

LARF features seven stages with day-long interactive entertainment. There are over 100 merchants offering hand crafted wares. These merchants also provide renaissance clothing, perfumes, ceramic horns, jewelry, and other distinct 16th century gift options. The festival includes much food, drink, treats and spirits—both modern and historical. Foods such as jester chips, bread bowls, turkey legs, and gourmet mushrooms are served. There is also a large "living village" reenactment with live cast members ready to show visitors a glimpse of pre-industrial life.

Though it is smaller in scale than older regional events, such as the Texas Renaissance Festival, with which its open season partly overlaps, LARF still attracts visitors from all over the country.

LARF was opened in 2000 to become Louisiana's first public annual renaissance festival. It opens the first weekend in November and runs for the following six weeks, including the Friday after Thanksgiving. LARF is also the last renaissance festival of the year-long season and ends the season with a closing gate jam and firework display over the lake.

In 2002 LARF received an award for best New Event of the Year Division, and it has been selected twice as one of the Southeast Tourism Society's TOP 20 Events in the Southeast.

LARF is a sponsor of the Renaissance Living History Center.

== See also ==
- Jousting
- List of open-air and living history museums in the United States
- List of Renaissance and Medieval fairs
- Louisiana Highway 1064
- Historical reenactment
- Society for Creative Anachronism
