= Nietgedacht =

- Location within Gauteng Location within South Africa
- Coordinates: 25.976°S 27.941°E
- Country: South Africa
- Province: Gauteng
- Municipality: City of Johannesburg
- Time zone: UTC+2 (SAST)

Nietgedacht is a suburb of Johannesburg, South Africa. It is located in Region A of the City of Johannesburg Metropolitan Municipality.

The words 'niet gedacht' translate literally from Dutch into the English words, 'never thought'.
