= Michigan Renaissance Festival =

Renaissance fair in Michigan, US

Coordinates: 42°50′44.17″N 83°34′39.13″W

- A jousting reenactment at the Michigan Renaissance Festival
- Genre: Renaissance fair
- Dates: August - October
- Locations: Holly, Michigan
- Inaugurated: 1979
- Attendance: 240,000 (average)
- Area: 312 acres (126 ha)
- Stages: 16
- Website: www.michrenfest.com

The Michigan Renaissance Festival (Mich Ren Fest) is a Renaissance fair, an interactive outdoor event that focuses on recreating the look and feel of a fictional English village called Hollygrove during the reign of Queen Elizabeth I in the latter half of the 16th century. A large number of patrons also regularly attend the festival in costume further fleshing out the streets with nobles, pirates, Vikings, wizards, rogues, wenches, and an assortment of fantasy characters. The festival also includes many nationally known Renaissance festival stage acts, juggling shows, sword fighting shows, lane acts, a two-hour feast performed twice daily, three full contact joust shows performed daily, and activities and games for children of all ages. The festival is owned by Mid-America Festivals.

The 2008 film All's Faire in Love was filmed at the Michigan Renaissance Festival.

== History ==
The festival began operation in 1979 on grounds adjacent to the Colombiere Center in Clarkston, near the junction of I-75 and Dixie Highway. In 1985, organisers moved the festival to 100 acres (40 ha) of property between I-75 and Dixie Highway, one mile (1.6 km) north of the Mount Holly Ski Resort. Roughly 30 acres (12 ha) have been developed so far for the actual festival site with 15 acres (6.1 ha) of that within the "village" walls and accessible to patrons. The property is accessible to patrons only from Dixie Highway, and includes two large parking areas, two lakes (Horton Lake and Walton Lake), and wetlands. The property is part in Holly Township, Michigan, part in Groveland Township, Michigan, and to honor this the fictional village's name was changed to "Hollygrove". Permanent structures and stages have been built over the years and the festival has been expanded steadily to accommodate an estimated annual attendance of 250,000 people.

In 2020 the fair was cancelled due to the COVID-19 pandemic, the seasons returned in 2021.

== Atmosphere ==
The festival recreates an English village of the period, to the point that they recreate the caste system of the time. The cast is divided into groups based on their character's social class. The highest class consists of Queen Elizabeth I and her royal court of nobility and knights. Following them would be the mayor, clergy, rich middle class, and visiting royal dignitaries. The middle class consists of merchants and tradesmen; characters with employment. The lower class consists of farmers, beggars, pirates, actors, and gypsies.

== See also ==
- List of Renaissance fairs
- Historical reenactment
- List of open air and living history museums in the United States
