= Pittsburgh Renaissance Festival =

Renaissance fair in West Newton, Pennsylvania

Coordinates: 40°10′48″N 79°41′49″W

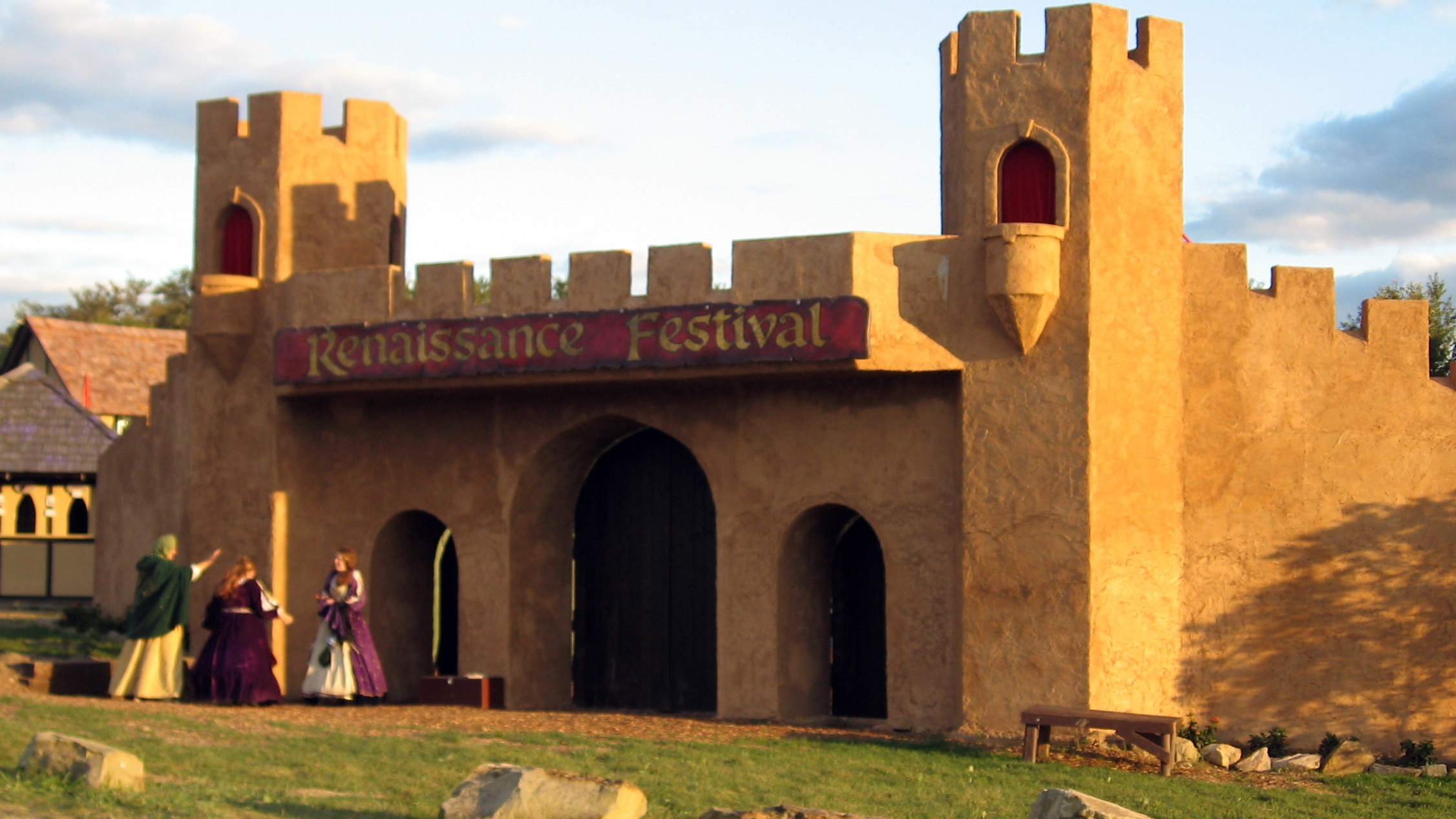
- Front gate of the fair
- Genre: Renaissance fair
- Dates: August - September
- Location: West Newton, Pennsylvania
- Inaugurated: 1994
- Area: 20 acres (81,000 m^{2})
- Stages: 6
- Website: www.pittsburghrenfest.com

The Pittsburgh Renaissance Festival is a Renaissance fair located in West Newton, Pennsylvania. The fair will enter season 33 next year. In 2005, the fair had 55,000 attendees. The faire covers 20 acres (81,000 m^{2}) and, as of 2008, has six stages.

The setting for the fair is a village called Morelandshire, sometime between 1533 and 1536.

== History ==
The fair was founded in 1994, and held for three seasons at the Butler County Fairgrounds, while the organizers searched for a suitable property. The present site, an abandoned farm which had subsequently been strip mined and landscaped, was selected for its ideal location and setting, and first hosted the fair in the summer of 1997. In 2006 the fair was canceled due to lack of financing. However, a year later, the fair was purchased by Rocky Mountain Festivals and was reopened under the direction of the company's CEO.

With the 2020 season cancelled because of the COVID-19 pandemic, the 27th was deferred to 2021.

== See also ==
- List of Renaissance fairs
