= Pennsylvania Renaissance Faire =

Annual cultural event in Manheim, Pennsylvania

Coordinates: 40.22666°N 76.43047°W

- Genre: Renaissance fair
- Dates: August – October
- Locations: Rapho Township, Lancaster County, Pennsylvania
- Inaugurated: 1981
- Attendance: 250,000 (average)
- Area: 35 acres (140,000 m^{2})
- Stages: 15
- Website: www.parenfaire.com/faire.html

The Pennsylvania Renaissance Faire is a Renaissance fair occurring over 13 weekends from early-August through late-October on the grounds of the Mount Hope Estate and Winery in Manheim, Pennsylvania. In 1980, the Estate was sold and converted to a winery.

== History ==
In 1980, a two-day jousting festival called the Pennsylvania Renaissance Faire was held in the winery parking lot to attract visitors. The event proved popular and expanded in the following years.

In 2009, the Faire was held on a 35-acre (140,000 m^{2}) site with 90 shows performed daily on 12 stages, hundreds of costumed characters, and a recreation of a 16th-century English village with authentic Tudor buildings. Musical performances, Shakespearean plays, and other acts were offered, twenty-three "Royal Kitchens" served food and drink, and Renaissance merchants were on-site. The Swashbuckler Brewing Company was founded on the grounds in 2000, and its product is available at the Swashbuckler Brew Pub.

Due to the COVID-19 pandemic, the 40th season was shortened to nine weeks from Labor Day weekend to November 1, when similar events were cancelled; however, the 41st season returned to the normal 13-weekend season at full capacity.

== Praise ==
The Faire's music and storytelling have been praised by the Pennsylvania Department of Conservation and Natural Resources and the Little Buffalo Performance Center, and, in 1998, the Faire was named one of the top 100 motorcoach-accessible events in America by the American Bus Association.

== Business ==
As a privately owned business, the faire is not required to report revenues to the public. In a 1998 interview, the former owner, Chuck Romito, revealed that "Gross sales for wine purchases and tickets for shows at the Mount Hope Estates--including Christmas, Halloween, Roaring '20s and other theme performances--hover around $4 million," while the fair's expenses were about $2 million.

As of 2008, American Renaissance festivals were much larger in scale than their European counterparts. Consuming History specifically mentions the Pennsylvania Renaissance Faire for its high attendance, along with the Maryland Renaissance Faire, which draws 225,000 visitors over three weeks, and the Bristol Renaissance Faire, which reached a peak in 1990 with 400,000 visitors across seven weekends.

== See also ==
- Jousting
- List of open air and living history museums in the United States
- List of Renaissance fairs
- Historical reenactment
- Society for Creative Anachronism
