= Georgia Renaissance Festival =

Renaissance fair in Fairburn, Georgia

Coordinates: 33°34′0″N 84°36′0″W

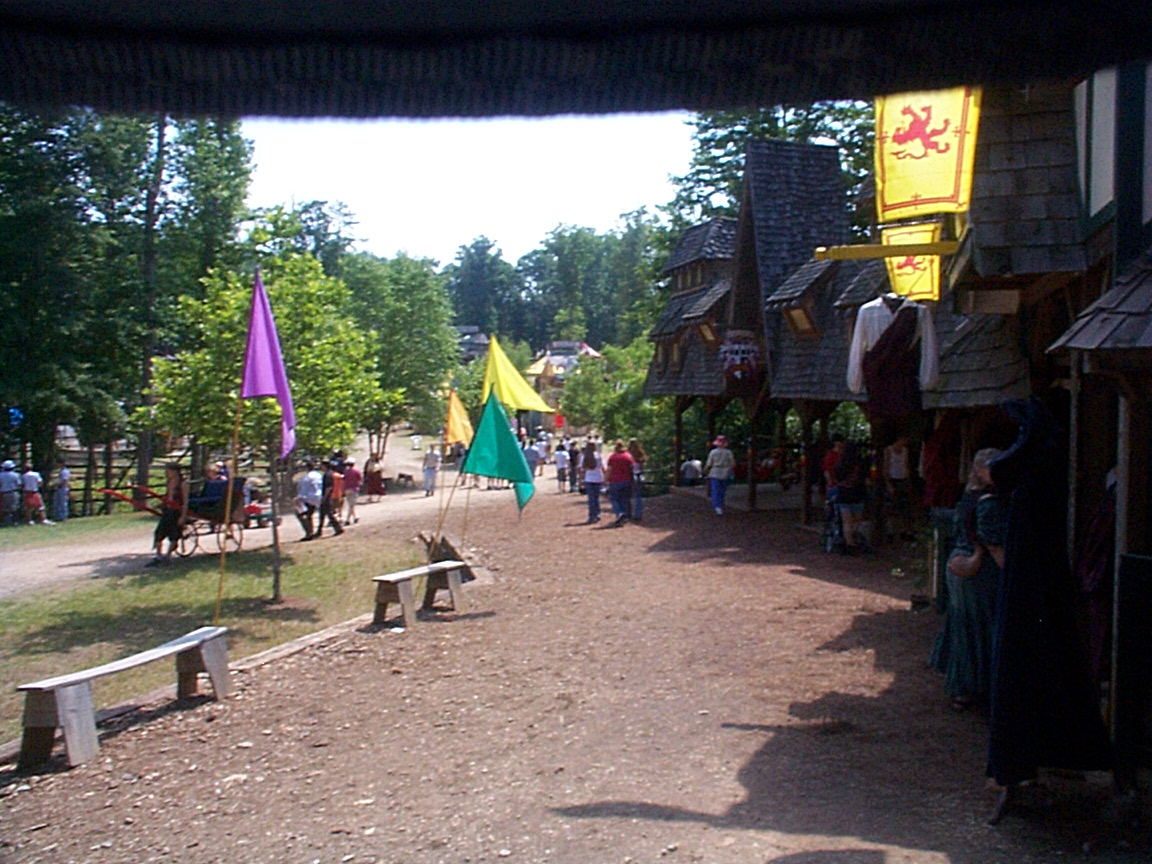
- Georgia Renaissance Festival in 2004
- Genre: Renaissance fair
- Dates: April–June
- Locations: near Fairburn, Georgia, United States
- Inaugurated: 1985
- Area: 32 acres (130,000 m^{2})
- Website: www.garenfest.com

The Georgia Renaissance Festival is a Renaissance fair that recreates England's renaissance for entertainment purposes. The time period for the festival is set as the 16th century, during the reign of King Henry VIII. The festival is located near Fairburn, Georgia, United States and has been in operation since 1986. Situated on 32 acres (130,000 m^{2}) of the land, the festival is open for eight weekends during late spring and early summer, plus Memorial Day and one Field Trip Day each year for Students to experience life in Renaissance England

The festival was canceled for the 2020 season because of COVID-19. From 2021 & hereafter, social distancing and wearing masks are required.

== Entertainment ==
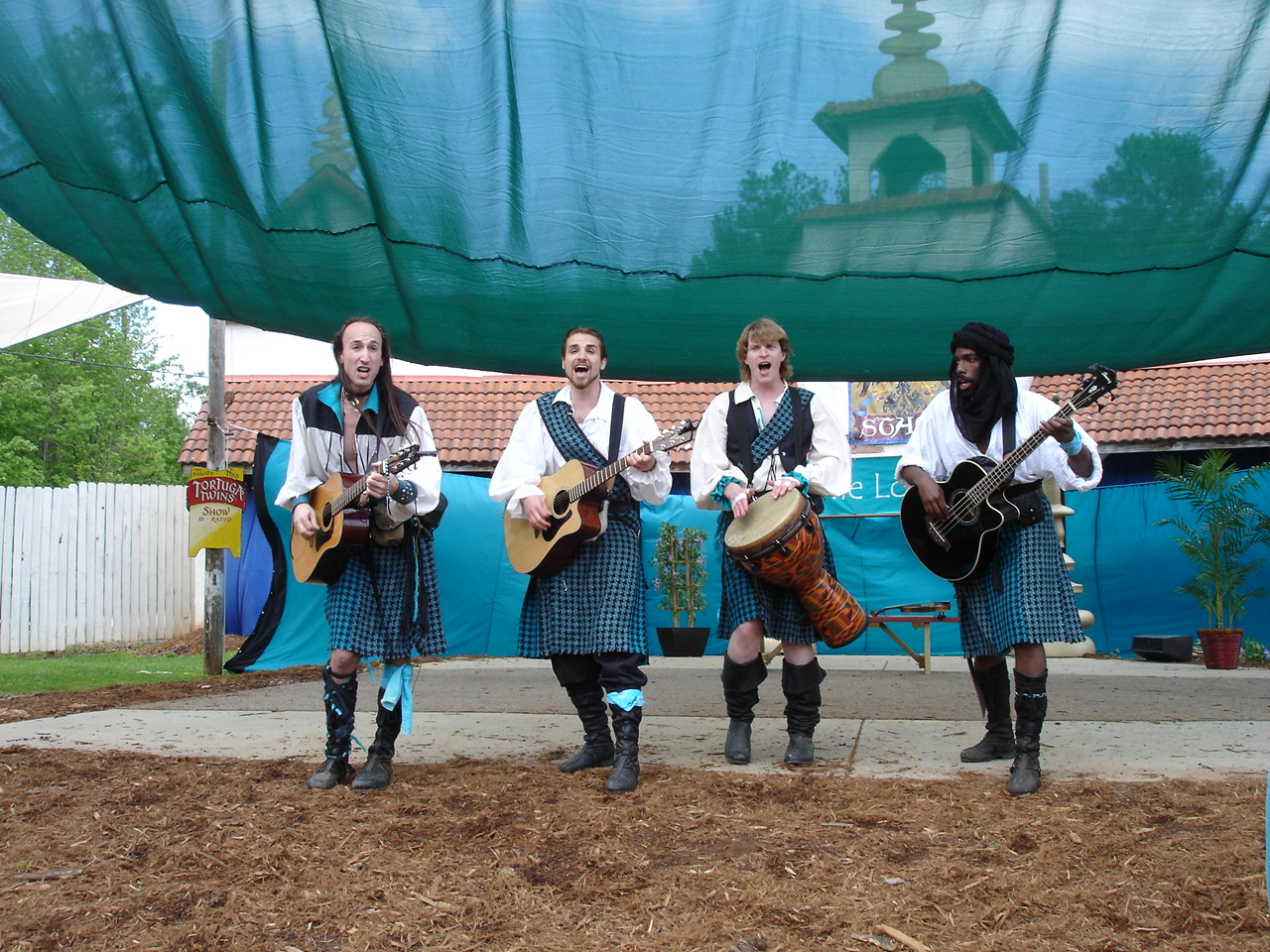
Performers on stage

Ten performance stages are situated throughout the festival, featuring shows for all ages. The entertainment includes jugglers, musicians, comedic storytelling, and the joust. Professional cast members portray the royal court, monks, and peasants. Patrons are encouraged to dress up as well.

The festival features more than 150 artisans, including wire bending, hair wraps and braiding, glassblowing, handmade pottery, and a coin mint. Most of the artisans offer a demonstration of their trade. There are also various clothiers which specialize in period costumes, weapon smiths, and a foundry that offers pewter items. Food vendors at the festival range from a simple lunch, such as turkey legs and ale, to dining at the tea room.

For children there are games of darts, arts and crafts, and rides like the Columbus ships or the Barrel of Bedlam. Children can also enjoy a petting zoo or the birds of prey show.

== Awards ==
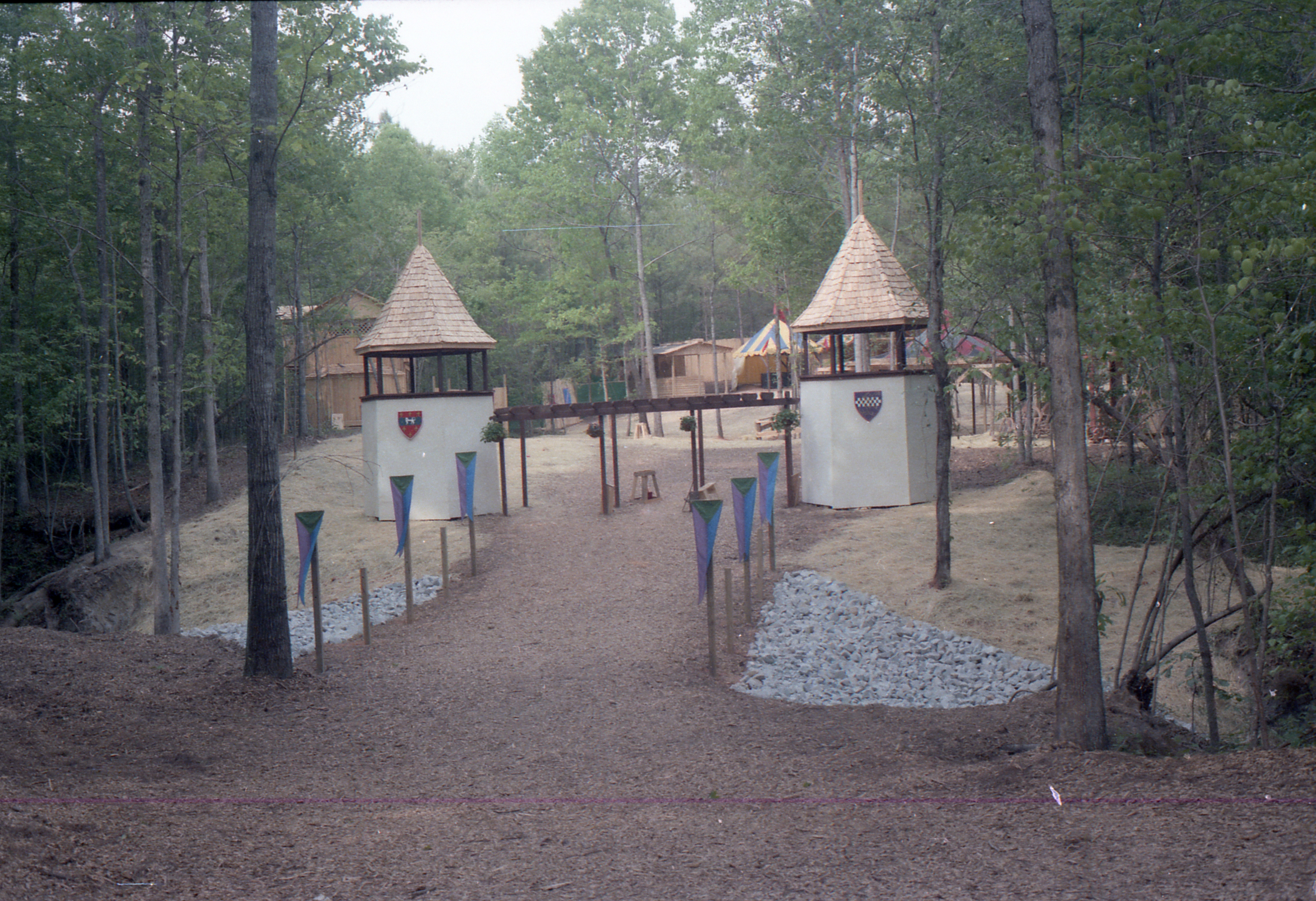
Entry gates during the Festival's inaugural year, 1985

The Georgia Renaissance Festival was voted as one of the top 20 Events in the Southeast from the Southeast Tourism Society in 2016.

In 1999 the American Bus Association voted the Georgia Renaissance Festival one of the top 100 events in North America.

== See also ==
- List of Renaissance fairs
