= Fairburn, Georgia =

- City
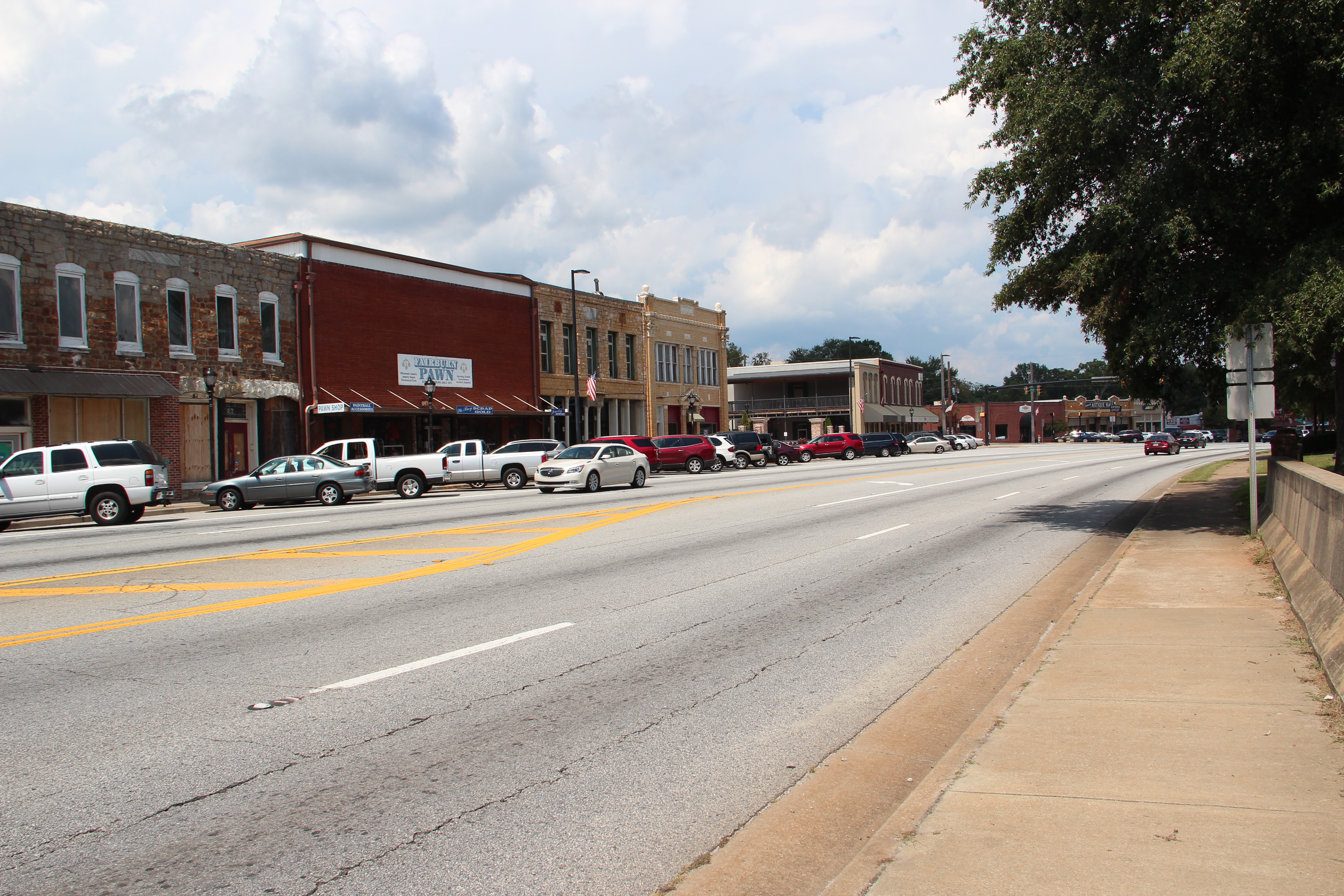
- Downtown Fairburn

- Flag Seal
- Motto: "Situated to Succeed"
- Location in Fulton County and the state of Georgia

- Location within Metro Atlanta
- Coordinates: 33°32′59″N 84°35′29″W
- Country: United States
- State: Georgia
- County: Fulton

Government
  - Type: Mayor–council government
  - Mayor: Hattie Portis-Jones
  - City Administrator: Tony Phillips

Area
  - Total: 17.12 sq mi (44.34 km^{2})
  - Land: 16.91 sq mi (43.79 km^{2})
  - Water: 0.21 sq mi (0.55 km^{2})
- Elevation: 1,027 ft (313 m)

Population (2020)
  - Total: 16,483
  - Density: 975/sq mi (376.4/km^{2})
  - Demonym: Fairburnite
- Time zone: UTC-5 (Eastern (EST))
  - Summer (DST): UTC-4 (EDT)
- ZIP code: 30213
- Area code: 770
- FIPS code: 13-28380
- GNIS feature ID: 2403586
- Website: www.fairburn.com

Fairburn is a city in Fulton County, Georgia, United States, with a population of 16,483, according to the 2020 census. The city is a closely linked suburb of Atlanta, which lies just 17 miles to the north.

== Name ==
The community is named after Fairburn, in England.

== History ==
Fairburn is located along a railroad line and was the county seat of Campbell County starting in 1871. It was chosen as county seat in a referendum in 1871 that was spurred by the original seat of Campbellton refusing to allow the Atlanta and West Point Railroad line through on account of the anticipated noise in the 1850s. The railroad instead passed through Fairburn. Campbellton then faded away as Fairburn grew. The government of Campbell County went bankrupt in 1931 during the Great Depression and, along with Milton County to the north, was absorbed into Fulton County when 1932 began. Fairburn's population was 305 in 1870, with 208 white and 97 black residents.

== Geography ==
Fairburn is located along Interstate 85, which leads northeast 20 miles (32 km) to downtown Atlanta and southwest 142 miles (229 km) to Montgomery, Alabama. Georgia State Route 74 also runs through the city, leading south 13 miles (21 km) to Peachtree City. Some areas in nearby Fayette County have a Fairburn mailing address.

According to the 2010 census, the city has a total area of 17.1 square miles (44.3 km^{2}), of which 16.9 square miles (43.8 km^{2}) is land and 0.2 square miles (0.5 km^{2}), or 1.24%, is water.

== Demographics ==
Historical population
Census	Pop.	Note	%±
1860	298		—
1870	305		2.3%
1880	563		84.6%
1890	695		23.4%
1900	761		9.5%
1910	1,395		83.3%
1920	1,600		14.7%
1930	1,372		−14.2%
1940	1,502		9.5%
1950	1,889		25.8%
1960	2,470		30.8%
1970	3,143		27.2%
1980	3,466		10.3%
1990	4,013		15.8%
2000	5,464		36.2%
2010	12,950		137.0%
2020	16,483		27.3%
2025 (est.)	17,133	▲	3.9%
U.S. Decennial Census; 1850-1870 1870-1880; 1890-1910 1920-1930; 1940 1950 1960; 1970 1980 1990; 2000 2010; 2025

=== Racial and ethnic composition ===
Fairburn city, Georgia – Racial and ethnic composition Note: the US Census treats Hispanic/Latino as an ethnic category. This table excludes Latinos from the racial categories and assigns them to a separate category. Hispanics/Latinos may be of any race.
Race / Ethnicity (NH = Non-Hispanic)	Pop 2000	Pop 2010	Pop 2020	% 2000	% 2010	% 2020
White alone (NH)	2,055	1,986	1,540	37.61%	15.34%	9.34%
Black or African American alone (NH)	2,579	8,966	12,601	47.20%	69.24%	76.45%
Native American or Alaska Native alone (NH)	12	33	16	0.22%	0.25%	0.10%
Asian alone (NH)	38	212	220	0.70%	1.64%	1.33%
Native Hawaiian or Pacific Islander alone (NH)	0	4	4	0.00%	0.03%	0.02%
Other race alone (NH)	5	35	71	0.09%	0.27%	0.43%
Mixed race or Multiracial (NH)	64	169	383	1.17%	1.31%	2.32%
Hispanic or Latino (any race)	711	1,545	1,648	13.01%	11.93%	10.00%
Total	5,464	12,950	16,483	100.00%	100.00%	100.00%

=== 2020 census ===
As of the 2020 census, Fairburn had a population of 16,483. The median age was 35.0 years. 24.9% of residents were under the age of 18 and 10.0% were 65 years of age or older. For every 100 females there were 85.0 males, and for every 100 females age 18 and over there were 79.0 males age 18 and over.

98.4% of residents lived in urban areas, while 1.6% lived in rural areas.

There were 6,192 households in Fairburn, of which 37.5% had children under the age of 18 living in them. Of all households, 33.4% were married-couple households, 19.4% were households with a male householder and no spouse or partner present, and 40.8% were households with a female householder and no spouse or partner present. About 28.1% of all households were made up of individuals, and 6.6% had someone living alone who was 65 years of age or older. There were 3,442 families.

There were 6,798 housing units, of which 8.9% were vacant. The homeowner vacancy rate was 2.8% and the rental vacancy rate was 11.7%.

== Education ==
K-12 education

- Fulton County Schools serves Fairburn.
- Arlington Christian School is a private school in Fairburn.
- Landmark Christian School is a private school in Fairburn.

Colleges and universities

- Georgia Military College has a campus located in Fairburn, offering associate degrees.

Public libraries

- Atlanta-Fulton Public Library System operates the Fairburn Branch.

== Culture ==
Fairburn is home to the Georgia Renaissance Festival, in operation during the springtime. The city of Fairburn hosts the popular "Third Friday" concert series annually from April through September. The city also hosts the "Fairburn Fall Festival" each fall, featuring a parade, local food and crafts vendors and musical performances. Both events draw thousands of participants from across the region.

== In popular culture ==
Fairburn was referenced in the 1970 song "Good Friends and Neighbors" by country singer Jerry Reed, a Georgia native. The song follows the story of a circuit judge from Monroe, Georgia who has been robbed of his billfold and car by a hitchhiker he picked up near Fairburn. The judge walked from where he was robbed, into Fairburn to see the sheriff, who becomes upset and believes the judge to be intoxicated and has a deputy throw the judge out into the rain. He then sits outside city hall for a time, attempting to hitchhike, before becoming upset that nobody has stopped to help him. The judge then storms into a local restaurant and tells the staff of his story, ending the song thanking the staff for hearing him out and saying "Glad I found one friend, neighbor. Thanks for the coffee."

Youtube personality Not The Expert has set multiple versions of the fictional "University of Georgia-Fairburn" inside of the NCAA 14, 25, and 26 football video games since 2018.
