= Arizona Renaissance Festival =

Annual event in Pinal County, Arizona

Coordinates: 33.320175°N 111.429838°W

- Genre: Renaissance fair
- Dates: Mid winter to early spring
- Locations: Gold Canyon, Arizona
- Inaugurated: 1989
- Attendance: 250,000 (average)
- Area: 50 acres (200,000 m^{2})
- Stages: 16
- Website: www.arizona.renfestinfo.com

The Arizona Renaissance Festival is a Renaissance-themed amusement park and Renaissance fair located in Gold Canyon, Arizona, east of the Phoenix metro area in Pinal County. First run in 1989, the Arizona Renaissance Festival runs from mid-winter to early spring every year due to the mild winter and spring weather. The fictional village of Fairhaven is open Saturdays, Sundays, and President's Day Monday.

In addition to the many stages of live entertainment, another popular feature is the Pleasure Feast.

The COVID-19 pandemic caused the 32nd annual festival to end early in mid-March 2020, besides deferring the next festival to 2022 (when it resumed), as 2021 saw it cancelled.

== General information ==
Designed to be reminiscent of a 16th-century English village, the 51-acre (210,000 m^{2}) festival fairgrounds feature 16-stages; regularly scheduled daily jousting tournaments; Birds of Prey display; games of skill such as: axe throwing, archery, and more; and a feast. The festival also has the Artisan Marketplace, an outdoor arts and crafts market located throughout the park in which merchants from around the nation and other countries sell different kinds of hand-made or period-themed goods.

Other staples of the park include a petting zoo, several live performances including comedy routines, sword swallowing, a live mermaid exhibit, and a selection of food such as 'steak on a stake', sausages, "turkey legs", and others. Patrons are welcome to wear costumes and costumes are available to rent at the festival.

== See also ==
- List of Renaissance fairs
- Historical reenactment
- Society for Creative Anachronism
- List of open air and living history museums in the United States
