= Middlefaire =

Festival site in Texas, United States

Coordinates: 32.0715°N 97.1799°W

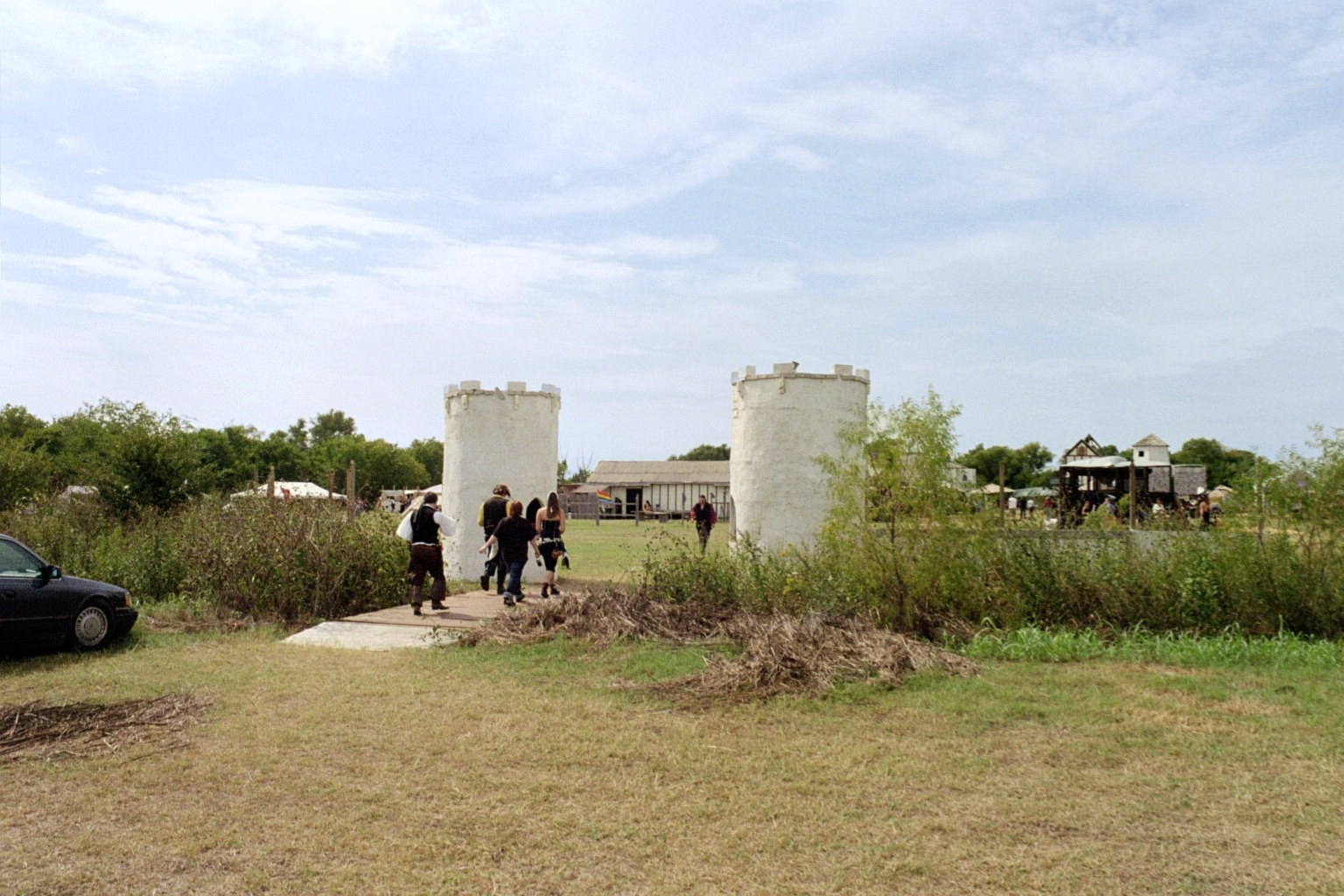
Fairgoers enter the Middlefaire site to attend the first Texas Pirate Festival. (2010)

Middlefaire was a festival site located near Hillsboro, Texas.

The 21-acre site opened in 2006 and features four festivals. These were Texas Pirate Festival held in June, Magical & Medieval Fantasy Faire in early October, Arts & Crafts Fair in late October and Renaissance Festival in November. During the Texas Pirate Festival & The Renaissance Festival, the faire was presided over by the court of Queen Claude of France, played by Deborah Papst. Other notable figures were the Duke of Orleans played by Dean Papst. During the Fantasy Faire a number of courts were present including the fairy court, presided over by Pebbles the Fairy, unseelie court, a creatures court with a Minotaur King and others.

== History ==
Middlefaire first opened with the Renaissance Festival on the weekend of October 14 and 15 in 2006. The 21-acre fair was created and owned by K. G. "Paul" Tuma, better known to fair-goers as Paul Delacroix. The site featured several permanent buildings, about half of which were built by merchants who sell at the site. They were arranged in a 17th-century English village.

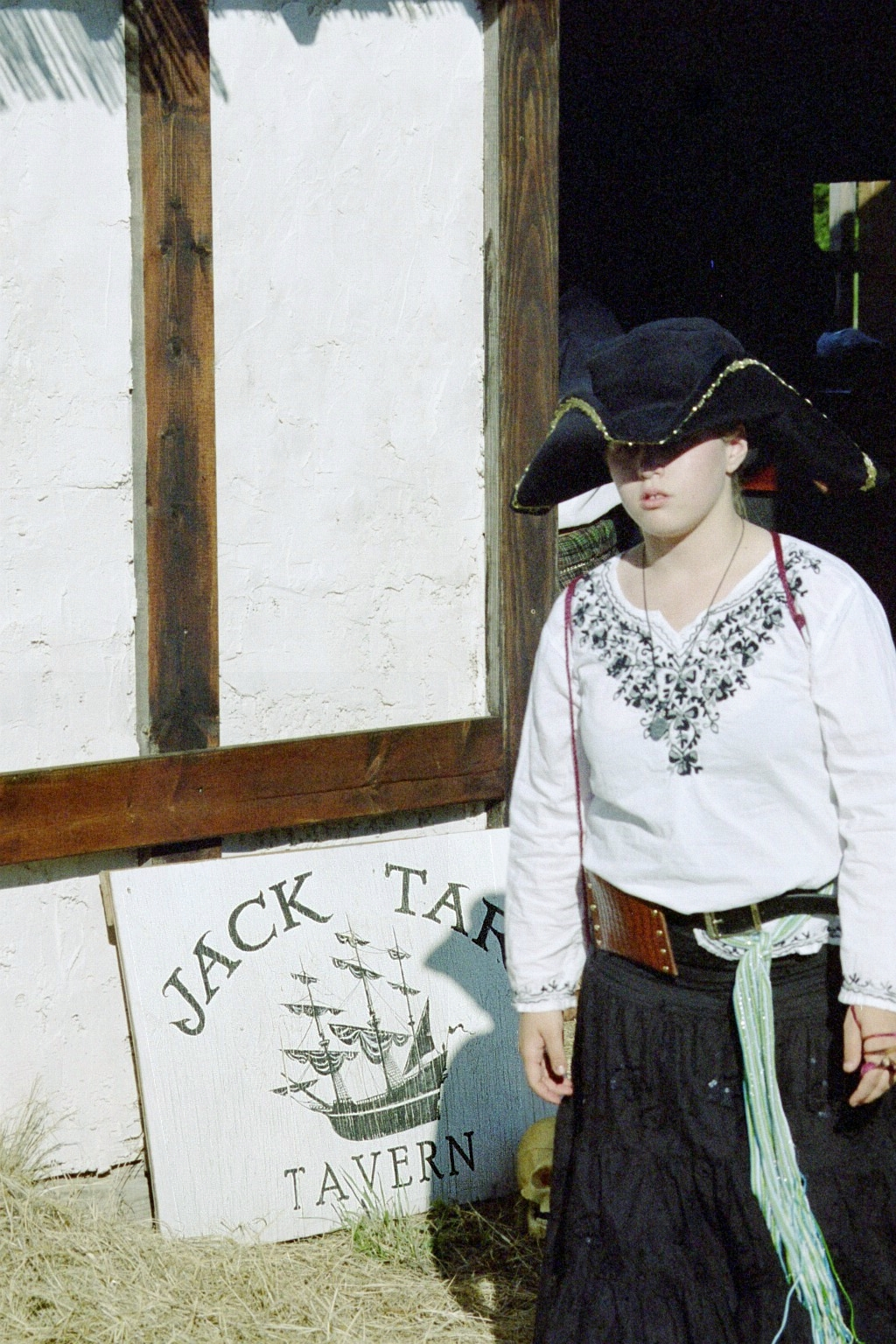
A girl exits Jack Tar Tavern at the first Texas Pirate Festival at Middlefaire. Binky the WonderSkull can be seen in the shadows. (2010)

The fair site was located at 8581 State Highway 171 at the intersection of County Road 1458, five miles north of Hillsboro. All three fairs featured a variety of merchandise and entertainers, typically singers, belly dancers, skits, musicians, pub sings, sword fights, jousting, pirate battles with historic working cannons, and other entertainments.

The COVID-19 pandemic caused 2020's cancellation & deferral. As of the beginning of 2024, the fair had not reopened.

== Attire ==
Entertainers and merchants typically dressed to fit the theme of the particular faire. While the site was primarily mid 17th century, this was not strictly adhered to, especially with the fantasy-themed Magical & Medieval Fantasy Faire
