= Federicus =

Italian festival event

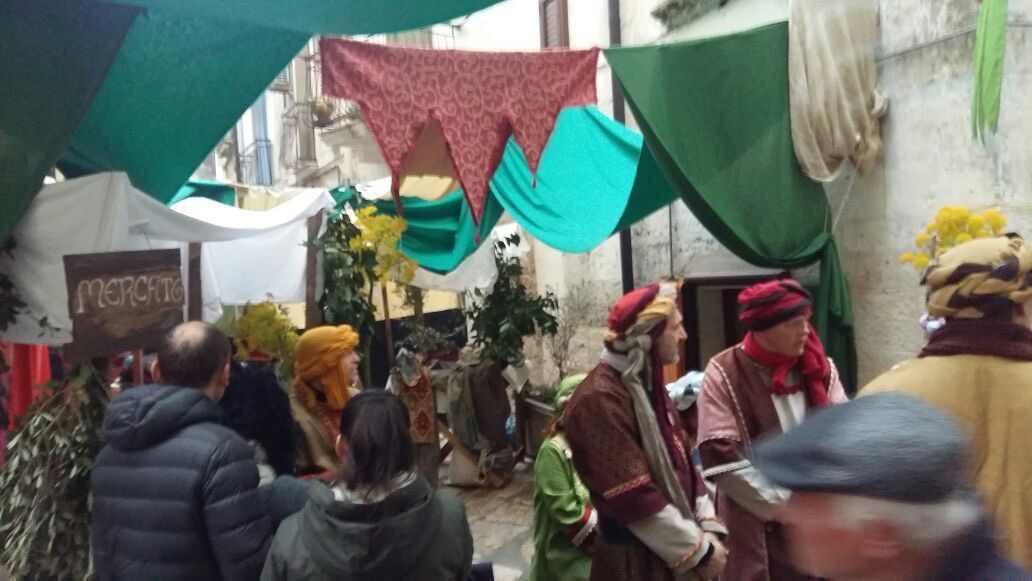
- Federicus 2017 activity in Altamura's historic centre
- Status: Active
- Genre: Historical reenactment event
- Date: April or May
- Frequency: Annually
- Venue: Altamura's historical city centre
- Location: Altamura
- Country: Italy
- Inaugurated: 2012
- Previous event: April 25, 2019 - April 28, 2019
- Next event: April 29, 2022 - May 1, 2022
- Organiser: Associazione Fortis Murgia; GAL Terre di Murgia
- Website: Official web page

Federicus (/ˌfɛdəˈrɪkʊs/; Italian: [fedeˈriːkus]) is a festival event that takes place every year in the historic city centre of Altamura, Italy. Its name is derived from the Latin name of king Frederick II, who founded the city of Altamura and by which the event is inspired. Among other things, parades re-enact the visit of Frederick II (with his entourage) to the city of Altamura. The event usually takes place in the second half of April, and it normally lasts three days.

== History ==
The event started in 2012 with Italian association Fortis Murgia, and since then it's been repeated every year, attracting several tourists mostly from other Italian regions and, to some degree, also from abroad. Altamura's schools are also closed during the event, mostly in order to let the students help organize it.

Past dates of Federicus
Year	Date	Theme
2012	---	
2013	19 April - 5 May	
2014	25–27 April	Fede, laicità e superstizione (faith, secularism and superstition)
2015	1–3 May	
2016	23–25 April	Superstizione (superstition)
2017	28 April - 1 May	Le donne e 'cavalier (title taken from the Divine Comedy)
2018	28 April - 1 May	Li affanni (title taken from the Divine Comedy)
2019	25 April - 28 April	Li agi (title taken from the Divine Comedy)
2020	1 May - 3 May (cancelled due to COVID-19)	Che fu d'onor sì degno (title taken from the Divine Comedy)
2021	30 April – 2 May (cancelled)	Che fu d'onor sì degno (title taken from the Divine Comedy)
2022	30 September – 2 October	Che fu d'onor sì degno (title taken from the Divine Comedy)

== Gallery ==
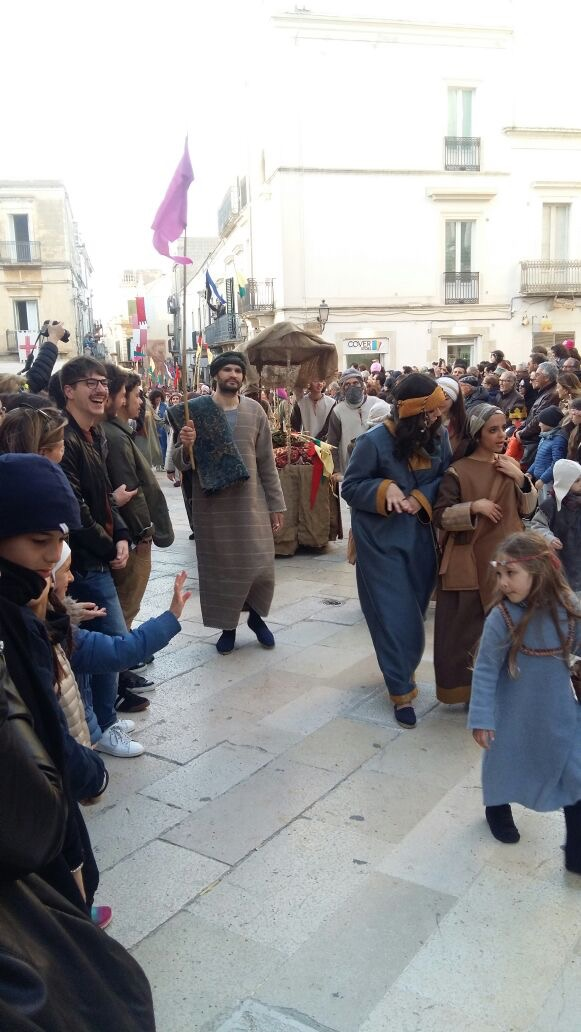
Federicus 2017 - Parade across Altamura Cathedral

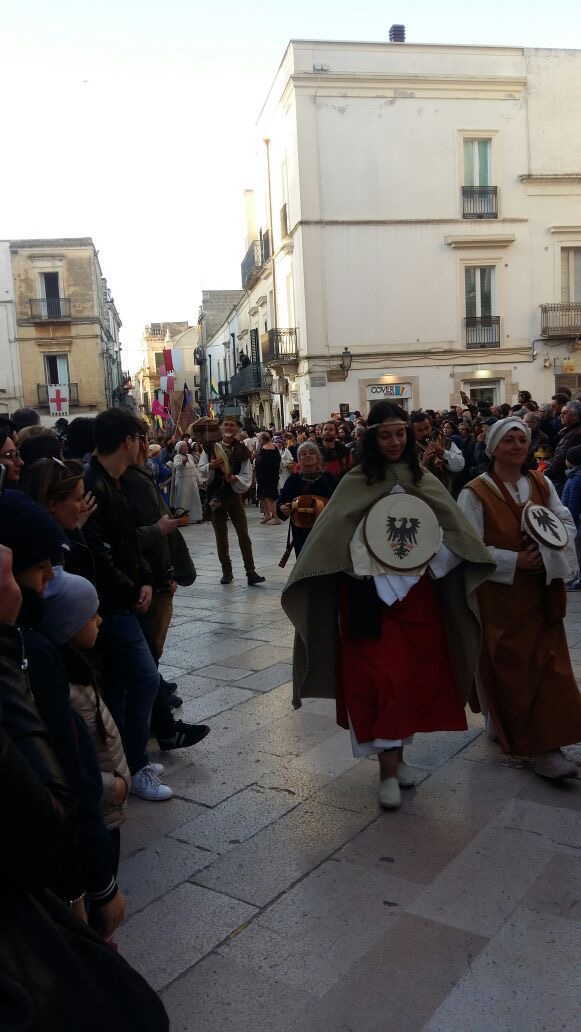
Federicus 2017 - Parade across Altamura Cathedral

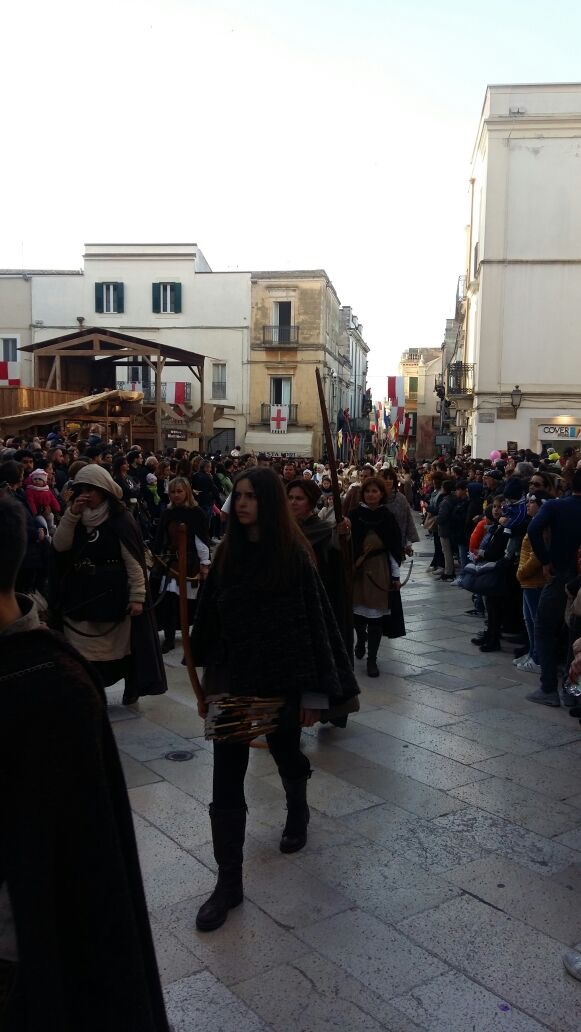
Federicus 2017 - Parade across Altamura Cathedral

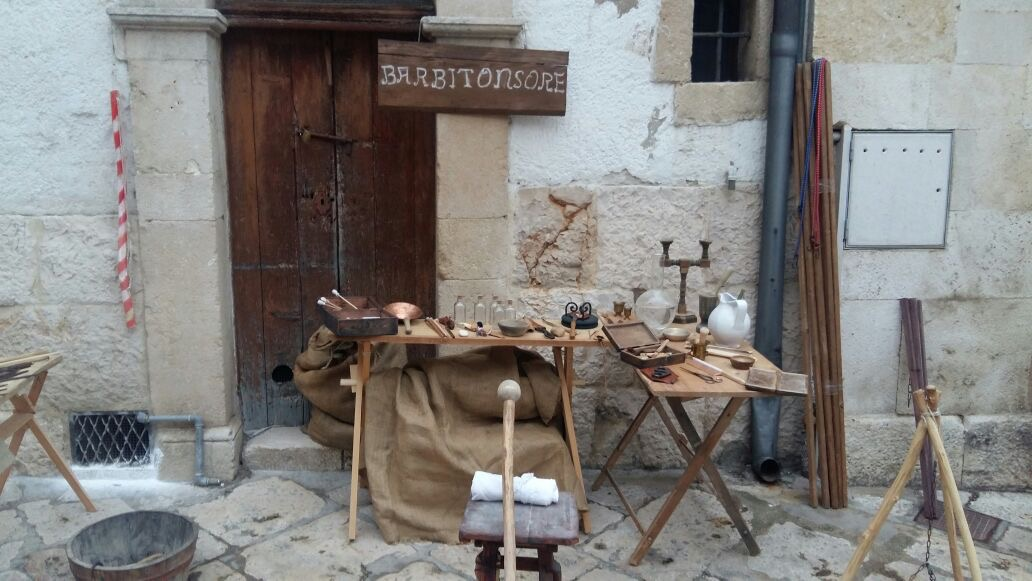
Federicus 2017 - Barbitonsore (the barbershop)

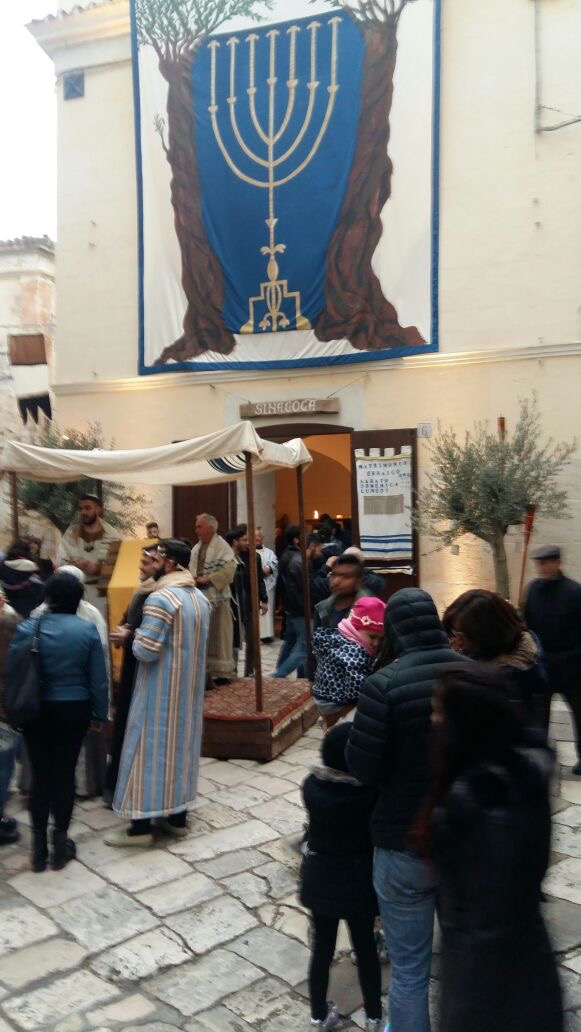
Federicus 2017 - The synagogue rebuilt in the medieval Jewish quarter

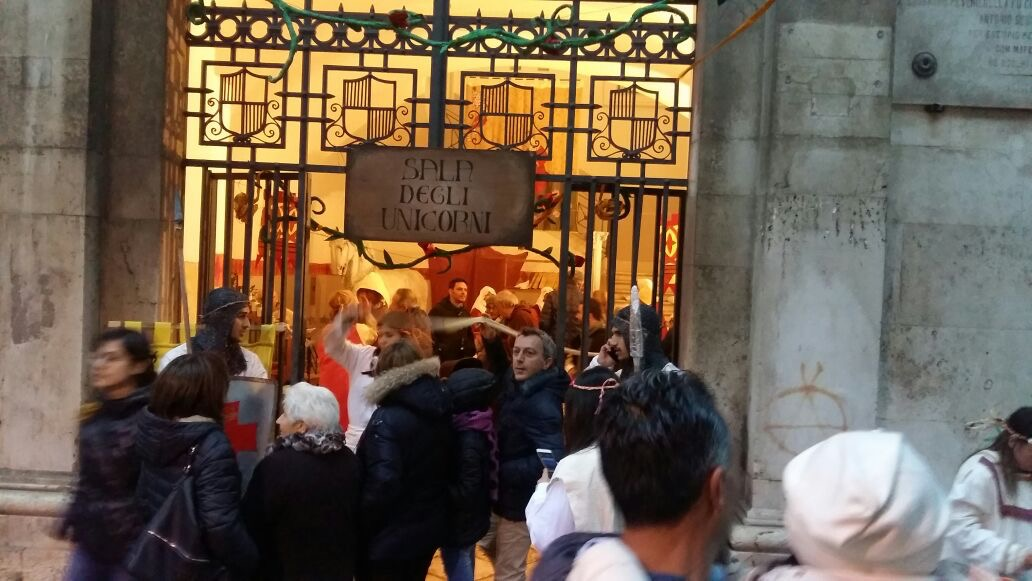
Federicus 2017 - The hall of unicorns

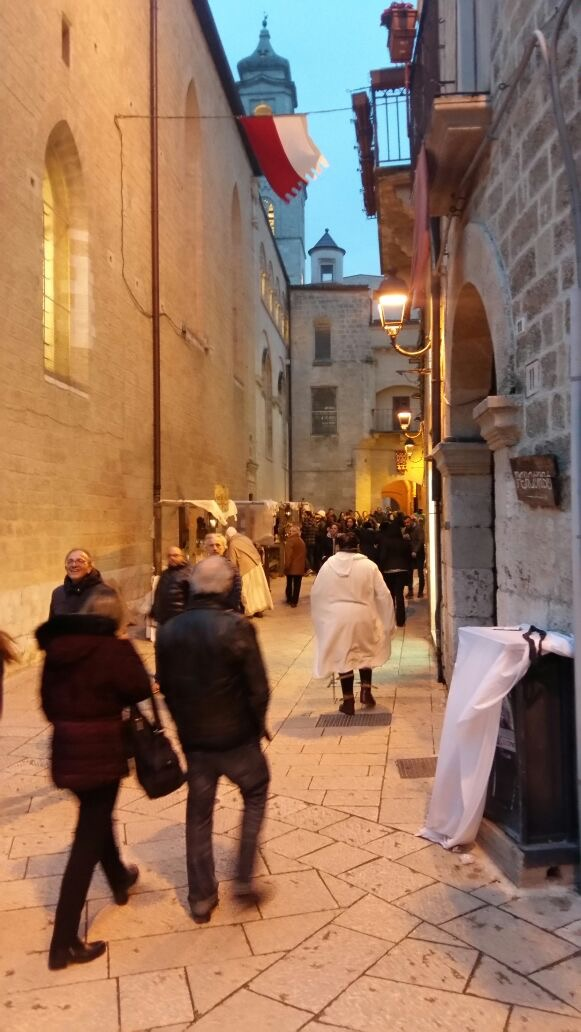
Federicus 2017 - Behind Altamura Cathedral

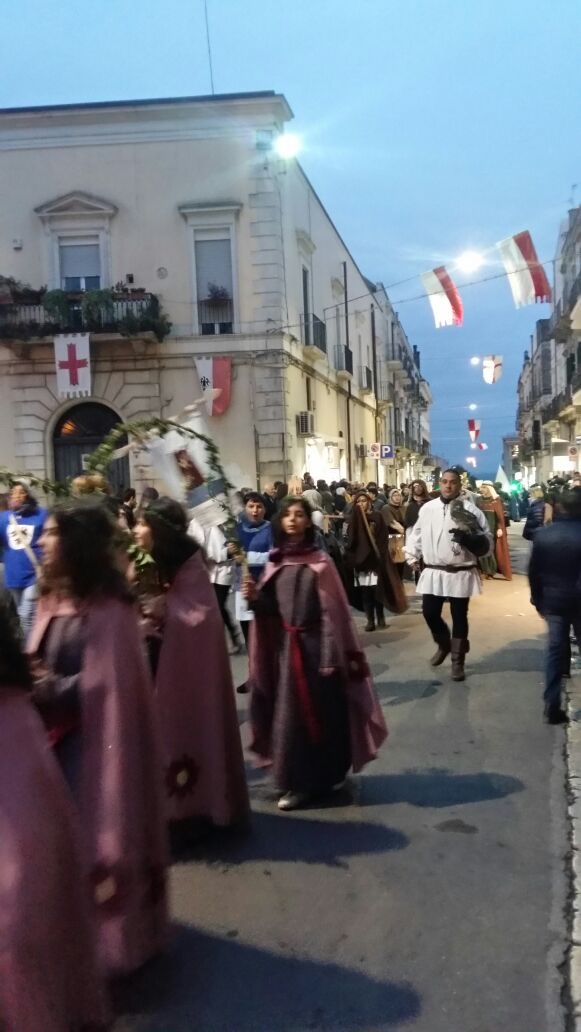
Federicus 2017 - Parade near Porta Montium (today named Porta Matera)
