= List of open-air and living history museums in the United States =

This is a list of open-air and living history museums in the United States.

== Farm museums ==
Alabama

- Landmark Park, Dothan

Alaska

- Alaska Native Heritage Center, Anchorage

California

- Ardenwood Historic Farm, Fremont, California, Bay Area
- California Citrus State Historic Park, Riverside
- Orcutt Ranch Horticulture Center, Los Angeles
- Rileys Farm, Oak Glen, 17th and 18th c. Living History, Revolutionary War, Civil War & Gold Rush
- Stein Family Farm / National City Living History Farm Preserve, San Diego

Colorado

- Littleton Museum – The Farms, Littleton
- Old Town Museum, Burlington

Florida

- Mission San Luis de Apalachee, Tallahassee
- Morningside Nature Center, Gainesville
- Panhandle Pioneer Settlement Living History Museum, Blountstown

Georgia

- Agrirama, Tifton
- Historic Westville, Columbus

Hawaii

- Kona Coffee Living History Farm, Kona District

Illinois

- Blackberry Farm, Aurora
- Corron Farm, Campton Hills
- Garfield Farm and Inn Museum, Campton Hills
- Kline Creek Farm, West Chicago
- Lincoln Log Cabin State Historic Site, Charleston
- Lincoln's New Salem State Historic Site, Springfield
- Naper Settlement, Naperville
- Peck Farm Park, Geneva
- Primrose Farm, St. Charles Township
- Volkening Heritage Farm, Schaumburg
- Wagner Farm, Glenview, Cook County

Indiana

- Amish Acres Historic Farm & Heritage Resort, Nappanee
- Buckley Homestead Living History Farm, Lowell
- Conner Prairie, Fishers
- Historic Tunnel Mill, Charlestown
- Lincoln Boyhood National Memorial, Lincoln City
- Prophetstown State Park, Battle Ground

Iowa

- Living History Farms, Urbandale
- Ushers Ferry Historic Village, Cedar Rapids

Kansas

- Old Cowtown Museum, Wichita

Kentucky

- Mountain Homeplace, Staffordsville
- Shaker Village of Pleasant Hill, Mercer County

Maine

- Norlands Living History Center, Livermore
- Sabbathday Lake Shaker Village, New Gloucester

Maryland

- Carroll County Almshouse and Farm, Westminster
- National Colonial Farm, Accokeek
- Oxon Cove Park and Oxon Hill Farm, Oxon Hill

Massachusetts

- Old Sturbridge Village, Sturbridge
- Pioneer Village, Salem
- Plimoth Patuxet Museums, Plymouth
- Spencer-Peirce-Little Farm, Newbury
- Waters Farm, Sutton
- Hancock Shaker Village, Pittsfield

Michigan

- Colonial Michilimackinac, Mackinaw City, Michigan
- Greenfield Village, Dearborn
- White Pine Village, Ludington, Michigan
- Waterloo Farm Museum

Minnesota

- Gammelgarden Museum of Scandia
- Heman Gibbs Farmstead, Falcon Heights
- The Landing, Shakopee
- Oliver Kelley Farm, Elk River

Nebraska

- Stuhr Museum of the Prairie Pioneer, Grand Island
- Wessels Living History Farm, York

New Hampshire

- The Fort at Number 4, Charlestown
- New Hampshire Farm Museum, Milton
- Strawbery Banke, Portsmouth
- Canterbury Shaker Village, Canterbury
- Enfield Shaker Museum, Enfield

New Jersey

- Historic Cold Spring Village, Cape May
- Historic Longstreet Farm, Holmdel
- Fosterfields Living Historical Farm, Morristown
- Howell Living History Farm, Titusville
- Liberty Hall (New Jersey)
- Old Barracks Museum Trenton, New Jersey

New Mexico

- New Mexico Farm and Ranch Heritage Museum, Las Cruces
- El Rancho de las Golondrinas, Santa Fe County

New York

- Erie Canal Village, Rome
- Fenimore Farm & Country Village, Cooperstown
- Genesee Country Village and Museum, Mumford
- Mabee Farm Historic Site, Rotterdam Junction
- Muscoot Farm, Somers
- Museum Village, Monroe
- Old Bethpage Village Restoration, Old Bethpage, Long Island
- Queens County Farm Museum, Glen Oaks, Queens, New York City
- Storm King Art Center, Mountainville
- Tilly Foster Farm Museum, Brewster

North Carolina

- Bethabara Historic District, Winston-Salem
- Carl Sandburg Home National Historic Site, Flat Rock
- Clemmons Educational State Forest, Clayton
- Cradle of Forestry in America, Brevard
- Duke Homestead and Tobacco Factory, Durham
- Holmes Educational State Forest, Hendersonville
- Horne Creek Living Historical Farm, Pinnacle
- Island Farm, Manteo
- Jordan Lake Educational State Forest, Apex
- Latta Plantation, Huntersville
- Long Valley Farm at Carvers Creek State Park, Spring Lake
- Rendezvous Mountain State Park, Purlear
- Turnbull Creek Educational State Forest, Elizabethtown
- Tuttle Educational State Forest, Lenoir

North Dakota

- Frederick A. and Sophia Bagg Bonanza Farm, Richland County

Ohio

- Gorman Heritage Farm, Evendale
- Hale Farm and Village, Bath Township, Summit County
- Heritage Village Museum, Sharonville
- Malabar Farm State Park, Richland County
- Sauder Village, Archbold
- Robbins Crossing Historic Village, Nelsonville, Ohio

Oklahoma

- Hunter's Home, Park Hill, Oklahoma

Oregon

- B Street Living Permaculture Museum, Pacific University
- Dorris Ranch Living History Farm, Springfield
- Dufur Historical Society Living History Museum, Dufur
- High Desert Museum, Bend
- Philip Foster Farm on the Oregon Trail, Eagle Creek
- Schreiber Log Cabin, Dufur
- Sherwood Heritage Center, Sherwood

Pennsylvania

- Colonial Pennsylvania Farmstead, Edgmont Township, Delaware County
- Deprecation Lands Museum, Hampton Twp. Allegheny County. https://dlmuseum.org/

Rhode Island

- Casey Farm, Saunderstown
- Coggeshall Farm Museum, Bristol
- Watson Farm, Jamestown

South Carolina

- Kings Mountain State Park, Blacksburg
- Historic Brattonsville, McConnells, South Carolina

Tennessee

- Exchange Place – Gaines Preston Farm, Kingsport
- The Homeplace, Land Between the Lakes
- Museum of Appalachia, Norris

Texas

- Barrington Living History Farm, Washington-on-the-Brazos
- Heritage Farmstead, Plano
- Nash Farm, Grapevine

Utah

- This Is the Place Heritage Park, Salt Lake City
- American West Heritage Center, Wellsville
- Wheeler Historic Farm, Murray

Virginia

- Chippokes State Park, Surry
- Claude Moore Colonial Farm, McLean
- Colonial Williamsburg, Williamsburg
- Frontier Culture Museum of Virginia, Staunton
- Matthews Living History Farm Museum, Independence

Vermont

- Shelburne Museum, Shelburne

Washington

- Pomeroy Living History Farm, Yacolt
- Fort Nisqually Living History Museum, Tacoma
- Historic Fort Steilacoom, Steilacoom

West Virginia

- Heritage Farm Museum and Village, Huntington
- Watters Smith Memorial State Park, Harrison County

Wisconsin

- Old World Wisconsin, Eagle
- Stonefield (Wisconsin), Cassville, Wisconsin

== Living transportation museums ==
- Allegheny Portage Railroad National Historic Site
- Antique Gas & Steam Engine Museum, Vista, San Diego County, California
- California State Railroad Museum, Sacramento, California
- Cole Palen's Old Rhinebeck Aerodrome, Red Hook, New York
- National Museum of Transportation, St Louis County, Missouri
- New York Museum of Transportation, Rush, New York
- North Carolina Transportation Museum, Spencer, North Carolina
- Railtown 1897 State Historic Park, Jamestown, California
- San Francisco Cable Car Museum, San Francisco, California
- Seashore Trolley Museum, Kennebunkport, Maine
- Southern California Railway Museum, Perris, Riverside County, California
- Steamtown National Historic Site, Scranton, Pennsylvania
- Travel Town Museum, Los Angeles, California
- Western America Railroad Museum, Barstow, California
- Western Railway Museum, Solano County, California

== Military forts and posts ==
The list of forts lists both historical, preserved and currently operational military posts. Not all are open to the public. Some of those open to the public will have living history guides.

Battery Gunnison, a US Army Coast Artillery Battery at Fort Hancock, New Jersey, is being restored to its 1943 configuration by the Army Ground Forces Association, a non-profit living history organization, and is open for tours throughout the year.

== Other open-air and living history museums ==
Arizona

- Pioneer Living History Museum, Phoenix
- Sharlot Hall Museum, Prescott

Arkansas

- Ozark Folk Center, Mountain View

California

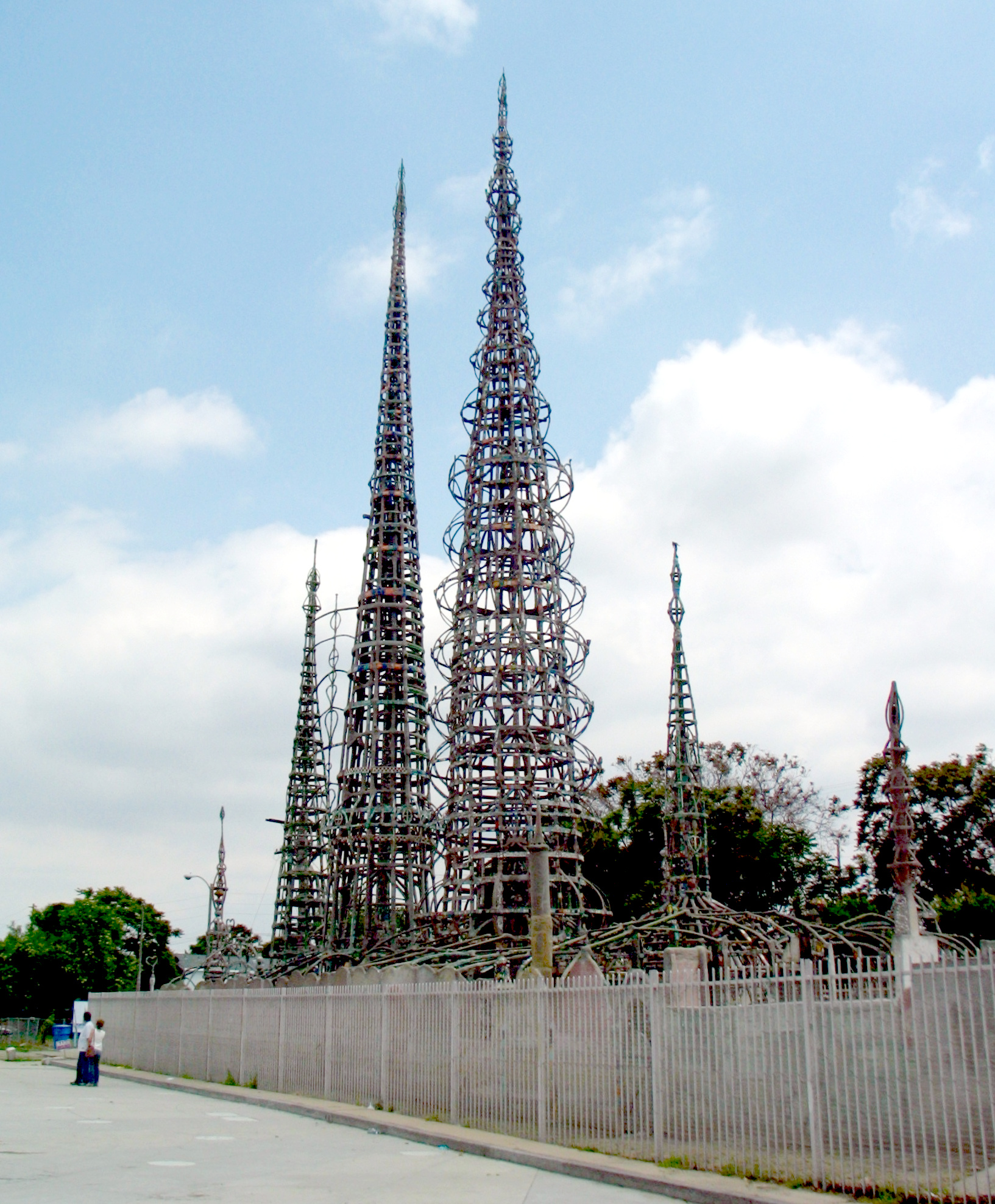
The Watts Towers Watts

- Bodie State Historic Park, Bodie
- Calico Ghost Town, San Bernardino County
- Casa del Herrero, Montecito
- Columbia State Historic Park, Columbia
- Empire Mine State Historic Park, Grass Valley
- Fort Ross State Historic Park, Fort Ross
- Hearst Castle State Historic Park, San Simeon
- Heritage Square Museum, Montecito Heights, Los Angeles
- La Purísima Mission State Historic Park, Lompoc
- Leonis Adobe Museum, Calabasas
- Los Angeles Plaza Historic District, Los Angeles
- Los Encinos State Historic Park, Encino, Los Angeles
- Marshall Gold Discovery State Historic Park, Placerville
- Monterey State Historic Park, Monterey
- Old Sacramento State Historic Park, Sacramento
- Riley's Farm & Living History Destination, Oak Glen
- Rubel Castle, Glendora
- San Dieguito Heritage Museum, Encinitas
- San Juan Bautista State Historic Park, San Juan Bautista
- Santa Susana Pass State Historic Park, Chatsworth, Los Angeles
- Virginia Robinson Gardens, Beverly Hills
- Watts Towers, Watts, Los Angeles
- Will Rogers State Historic Park, Pacific Palisades, Los Angeles

Colorado

- Bent's Old Fort National Historic Site, Otero County
- Fort Uncompahgre Living History Museum, Delta
- Four Mile Historic Park, Denver
- Rock Ledge Ranch Historic Site, at Garden of the Gods, Colorado Springs
- South Park City, Fairplay
- Cross Orchards Grand Junction

Connecticut

- Mystic Seaport, Mystic

Florida

- Bellevue Plantation, Tallahassee
- Castillo de San Marcos, St. Augustine
- Cracker Country, Tampa
- Fort Clinch State Park, Amelia Island
- Lake Kissimmee State Park, Lake Wales
- Mission San Luis de Apalachee, Tallahassee
- Silver River Museum, Marion County
- Yesteryear Village, on the South Florida Fairgrounds, Palm Beach County

Georgia

- Westville, Lumpkin

Hawaii

- Kona Coffee Living History Farm, Kona District
- Polynesian Cultural Center, Lā'ie

Illinois

- Lincoln Log Cabin State Historic Site, Charleston
- Lincoln's New Salem, Menard County
- Macktown Living History Education Center, Rockton
- Midway Village Museum, Rockford
- Naper Settlement, Naperville

Indiana

- Conner Prairie, Fishers
- Historic Tunnel Mill, Charlestown
- Lincoln Boyhood National Memorial, Lincoln City
- Spring Mill State Park, Mitchell

Iowa

- Living History Farms, Urbandale

Kansas

- Boot Hill Museum, Dodge City
- Old Cowtown Museum, Wichita
- Outdoor Museum, Abilene
- Shawnee Town 1929, Shawnee
- Green Elm School at the Crawford County Historical Museum, Pittsburg

Kentucky

- Adsmore, Princeton
- My Old Kentucky Home State Park, Bardstown
- Shaker Village of Pleasant Hill, Mercer County

Louisiana

- Acadian Village (park), Lafayette
- Fort St. Jean Baptiste State Historic Site, Natchitoches
- Germantown Colony and Museum, Webster Parish
- Longfellow-Evangeline State Historic Site, St. Martinville
- Longue Vue House and Gardens, New Orleans
- Oakland Plantation, Natchitoches Parish
- LSU Rural Life Museum, Baton Rouge
- Vermilionville Historic Village, Lafayette
- West Baton Rouge Museum, Port Allen

Maine

- Fort Western, Augusta
- Maine Forest & Logging Museum, living history site known as Leonard's Mills, Bradley
- Washburn-Norlands Living History Center, Livermore
- Willowbrook Museum Village, Newfield

Maryland

- Button Farm Living History Center, Germantown
- Chesapeake Bay Maritime Museum, St. Michaels
- Historic London Town and Gardens, Edgewater
- Historic St. Mary's City, St. Mary's City
- Jerusalem Mill, Kingsville

Massachusetts

- Hancock Shaker Village, Hancock
- Historic Deerfield, Deerfield
- Plimoth Patuxet Museums, Plymouth
- Old Sturbridge Village, Sturbridge

Michigan

- Crossroads Village & Huckleberry Railroad, Flint, Michigan, Village (Michigan)
- Greenfield Village, Dearborn
- Historic Mill Creek State Park, Mackinaw City
- Michigan's Heritage Park, Whitehall

Minnesota

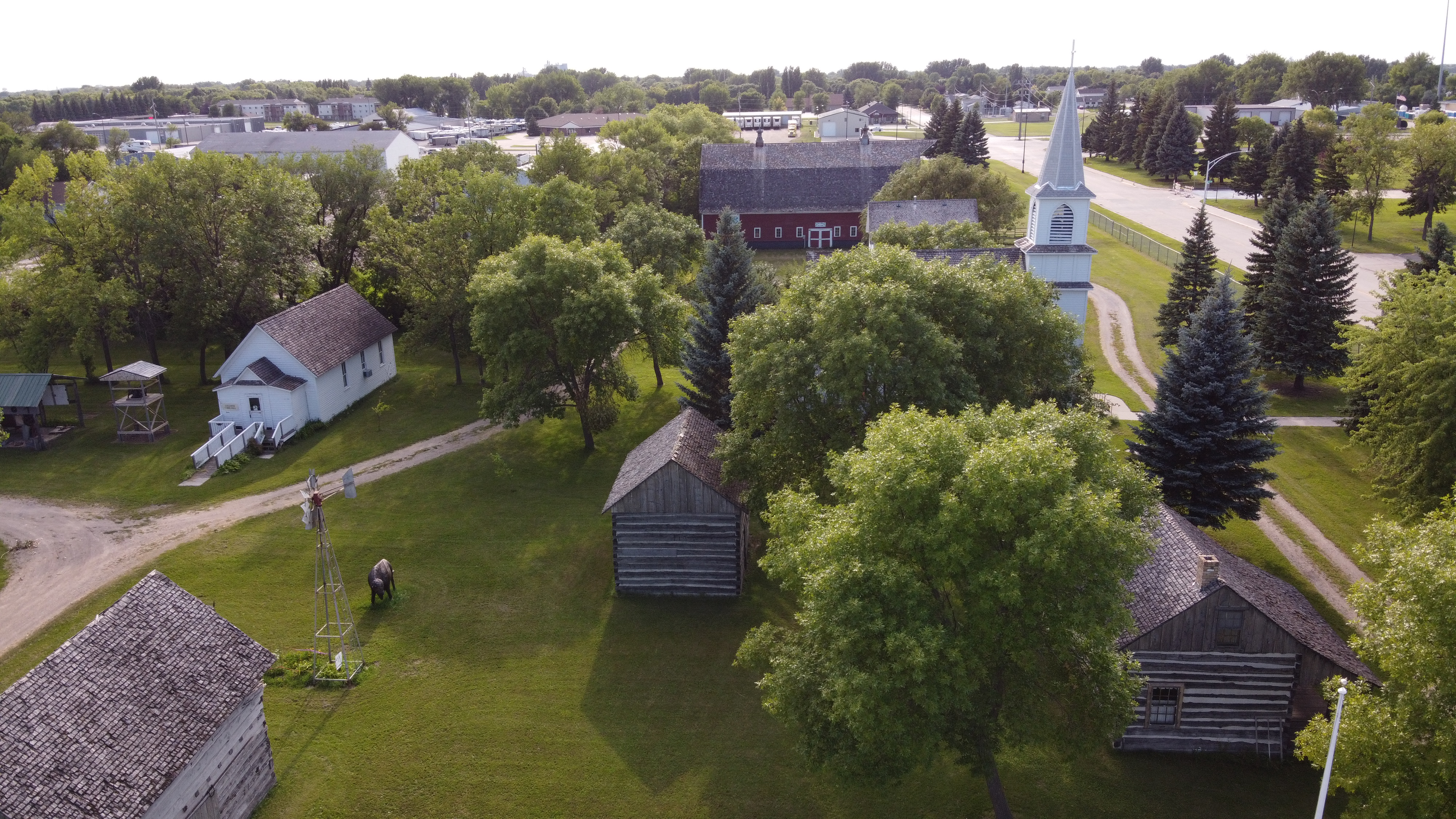
East Grand Forks Heritage Village, East Grand Forks, Minnesota

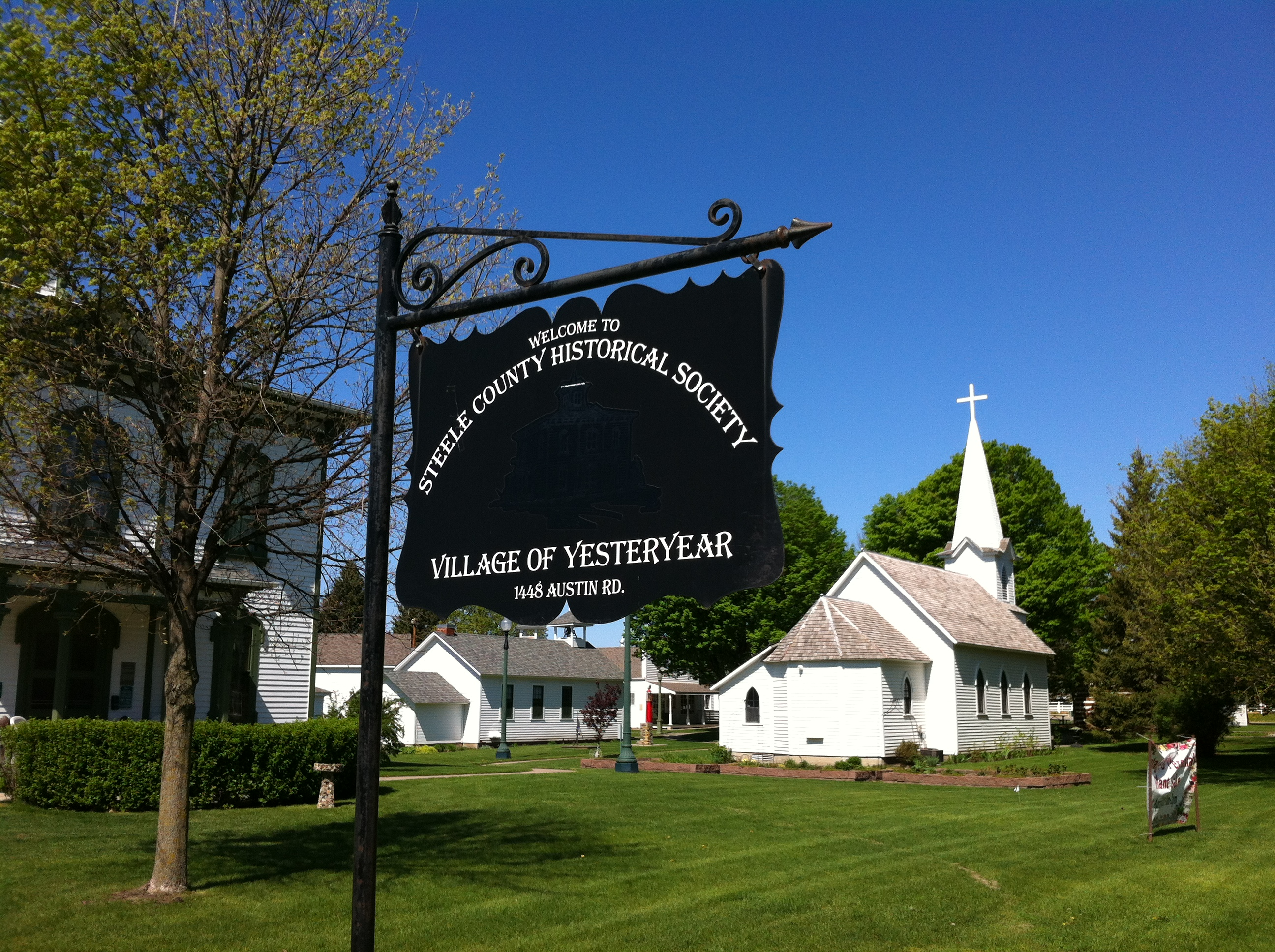
Village of Yesteryear, Owatonna, Minnesota

- Big Stone County Museum, Ortonville
- Dakota City Heritage Village, Farmington
- East Grand Forks Heritage Village, East Grand Forks
- Esko Historical Society Museum, Esko
- Fillmore County Historical Society Open-Air Museum, Fountain
- Forest History Center, Grand Rapids
- Gibbs Museum of Pioneer and Dakotah Life, Falcon Heights
- Forestville, Minnesota Fillmore County
- Jeffers Petroglyphs, Jeffers
- Nobles County Pioneer Village, Worthington
- Norman County Prairie Village, Ada
- Oliver Kelley Farm, Elk River
- Peder Engelstad Pioneer Village, Thief River Falls
- Settler's Square Museum, Warren
- Snake River Fur Post, Pine City
- The Landing, Shakopee
- Traverse des Sioux, St. Peter
- Upper Sioux Agency State Park, Yellow Medicine County
- Village of Yesteryear, Owatonna

Missouri

- Faust Park Historic Village, Chesterfield
- Missouri Town 1855, Lee's Summit
- Shoal Creek Living History Museum, Kansas City

Montana

- Daniels County Museum & Pioneer Town, Scobey
- Nevada City Living History Museum, Virginia City

New Hampshire

- Fort at Number 4, Charlestown
- Strawbery Banke, Portsmouth

New Jersey

- Allaire Village, Wall Township
- Historic Cold Spring Village, Cape May
- Longstreet Farm, Holmdel Township

New York

- Buffalo Niagara Heritage Village, Amherst
- Erie Canal Village, Rome
- Fort Klock homestead, St. Johnsville
- Genesee Country Village and Museum, Mumford
- Hanford Mills Museum, East Meredith
- Heritage Village of the Southern Finger Lakes, Corning
- Historic Richmond Town, Richmondtown, Staten Island
- Islip Grange, Sayville
- Monument Park, The Bronx
- Museum Village at Old Smith's Clove, Monroe
- Old Bethpage Village Restoration, Old Bethpage
- Old Stone Fort, Schoharie
- Weeksville Heritage Center, Brooklyn
- Aaron House of Niagara Falls, [Niagara Falls]

North Carolina

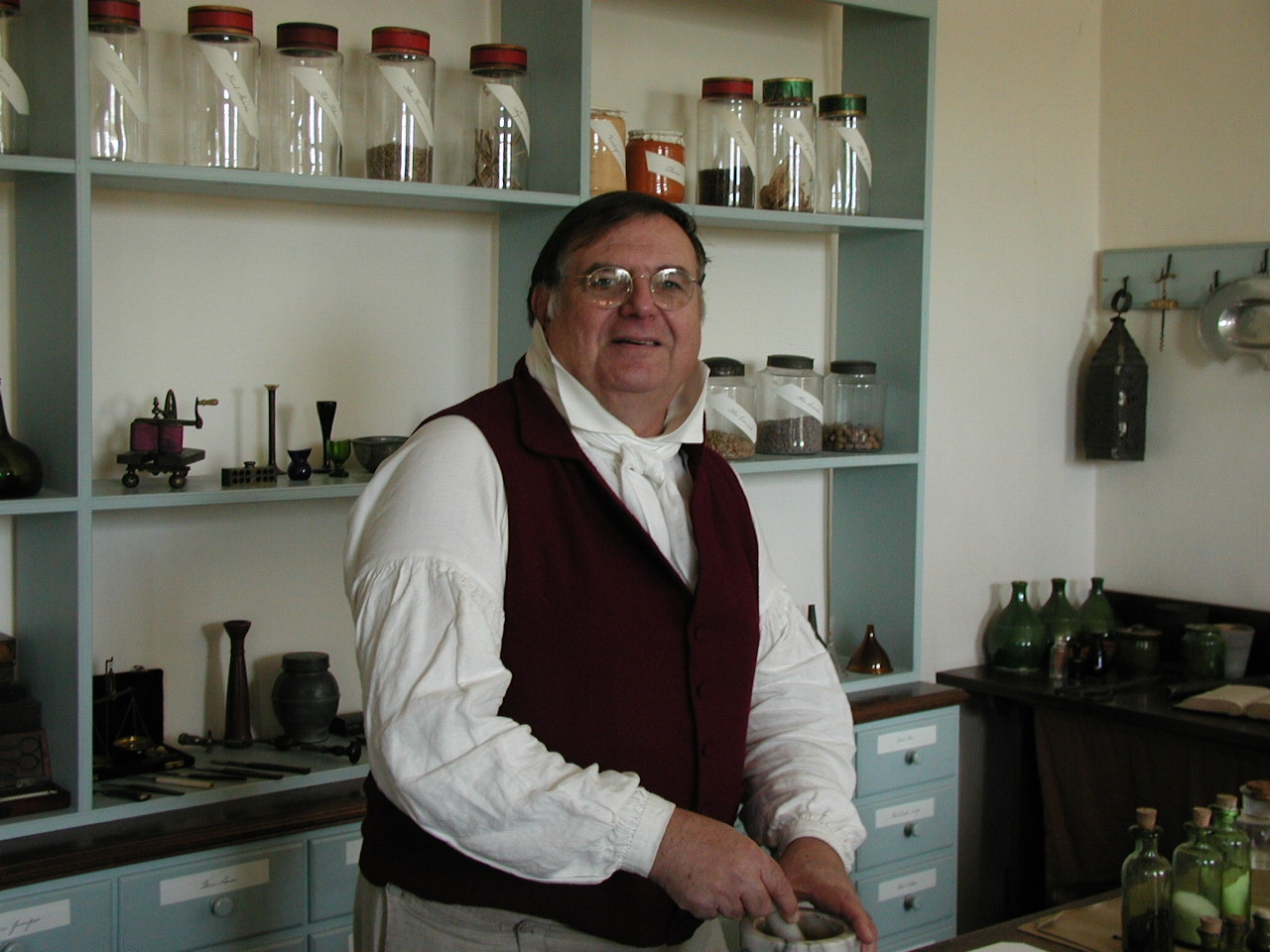
A museum interpreter explains aspects of a 19th-century apothecary in Old Salem

- Bethabara Historic District, Winston-Salem
- Dragon Fly Trail at Lake Norman State Park, Troutman
- Holly Discovery Trail at Lake James State Park, Nebo
- Hutchinson Homestead & Garden Creek Baptist Church at Stone Mountain State Park, Traphill
- Mountain Gateway Museum and Heritage Center, Old Fort
- Oconaluftee Indian Village, Cherokee
- Old Salem, Winston-Salem
- Piper-Cox House at Eno River State Park, Durham
- Roanoke Island Festival Park, Manteo
- Supple-jack Trail at Dismal Swamp State Park, South Mills

North Dakota

- Fort Union Trading Post National Historic Site, Yellowstone

Ohio

- Caesar's Creek Pioneer Village, Waynesville
- Hale Farm & Village, Bath
- Heritage Village Museum, Sharonville
- Ohio Village, Columbus
- Roscoe Village, along the former Ohio and Erie Canal, Coshocton

Pennsylvania

- Conrad Weiser Homestead, Womelsdorf
- Daniel Boone Homestead, Birdsboro
- Depreciation Lands Museum, a Colonial Living History Village, Pittsburgh
- Historic Hanna's Town
- Hopewell Furnace National Historic Site, Elverson
- Landis Valley Museum, Lancaster
- Oliver Miller Homestead, South Park Township
- Somerset Historical Center, Somerset
- Old Bedford Village, Bedford, PA
- The Frick Pittsburgh
- Tour-Ed Mine
- West Overton Village
- Woodville

Rhode Island

- South County Museum, Narragansett

Tennessee

- Historic Collinsville, Clarksville
- Rocky Mount Museum, Piney Flats

Texas

- George Ranch Historical Park, Fort Bend County
- Gonzales Pioneer Village Living History Center
- Dallas Heritage Village at Old City Park, Dallas
- Farmers Branch Historical Park, Farmers Branch
- Frontier Village & Museum, Denison
- Log Cabin Village, Fort Worth
- Buffalo Gap Historic Village, Buffalo Gap
- Jourdan-Bachman Pioneer Farms, Austin
- Sauer Beckmann Farm, Stonewall

Vermont

- Shelburne Museum, Shelburne

Virginia

- Colonial Williamsburg, Williamsburg
- Frontier Culture Museum of Virginia, Staunton
- Henricus Historical Park, Chesterfield County
- Jamestown Settlement, Jamestown
- Menokin, Warsaw
- Mount Vernon, home of George Washington, including a working farm, grist mill and distillery
- Pamplin Historical Park, Petersburg

Washington

- Camlann Medieval Village, Carnation
- Fort Walla Walla, museum and pioneer village, Walla Walla

West Virginia

- Prickett's Fort State Park, Marion County

Wisconsin

- Forts Folle Avoine Historical Park, Danbury
- Galloway House and Village, Fond du Lac
- Heritage Hill State Historical Park, Allouez
- Little Norway, Blue Mounds
- Old World Wisconsin, Eagle
- Ozaukee County Pioneer Village, Saukville
- Pinecrest Historical Village, Manitowoc
- Pioneer Village Museum, Cameron
- Pioneer Park Historical Complex, Rhinelander
- Schumacher Farm County Park, Waunakee
- Wade House Historic Site
- Waswagoning Re-Created Ojibwe Village

Wyoming

- Museum of the American West, Lander

== See also ==
- List of tourist attractions providing reenactment
- List of tourist attractions (worldwide)

Museum name	Town	State	Type	Summary
Alabama Constitution Village	Huntsville	Alabama	Living	1819 life, includes a law office, print shop, land surveyor's office, post office, cabinetmaker's shop and residence
Landmark Park	Dothan	Alabama	Living	1890s living history farm and village
Pioneer Living History Village	Phoenix	Arizona	Living	Late 19th-century town
Sharlot Hall Museum	Prescott	Arizona	Open-air	Includes special living history programs for mid-1860s
Ozark Folk Center	Mountain View	Arkansas	Living	State park with traditional crafts and music
Columbia State Historic Park	Columbia	California	Living	Mid-to-late 19th-century Gold Rush town
Empire Mine State Historic Park	Grass Valley	California	Living	Late 19th-century living history tours, gold mine complex
Heritage Square Museum	Montecito Heights, Los Angeles	California	Living	Covers different periods; includes eight historic structures, a train car, and a trolley car
Leonis Adobe	Calabasas	California	Living	1880s California ranch
San Dieguito Heritage Museum	Encinitas	California	Local history	Offers family living history programs on special days
Stein Family Farm	National City	California	Farm	website, focus is rural life from 1900 to 1920
Bent's Old Fort National Historic Site	Otero County	Colorado	Living	Reconstructed 1840s adobe fur trading post on the mountain branch of the Santa Fe Trail
Fort Uncompahgre Living History Museum	Delta	Colorado	Living	website, 1820s fur trading post
Rock Ledge Ranch Historic Site, Garden of the Gods	Colorado Springs	Colorado	Living	Depicts life in four time periods: American Indian area in 1775; 1860s Galloway Homestead; 1880s Chambers Home and Ranch; 1907 Edwardian Country Estate
South Park City	Fairplay	Colorado	Open-air	Mid-19th-century recreated mining town
Mystic Seaport	Mystic	Connecticut	Living	19th-century maritime village with historic ships and buildings
Barberville Pioneer Settlement	Barberville	Florida	Open-air/living	Late 19th- to early 20th-century rural life, 18 structures 1879 - 1926 http://www.pioneersettlement.org
Bellevue Plantation	Tallahassee	Florida	Farm	Part of the Tallahassee Museum
Castillo de San Marcos	St. Augustine	Florida	Living	Colonial fort
Cracker Country	Tampa	Florida	Open-air	Late 19th- to early 20th-century rural life, includes thirteen original buildings dating from 1870 to 1912
Fort Clinch State Park	Fernandina Beach	Florida	Living	19th-century fort with period re-enactors
Lake Kissimmee State Park	Lake Wales	Florida	Living	Includes Cow Camp, an 1876 cattle camp
Mission San Luis de Apalachee	Tallahassee	Florida	Living	Reconstructed 17th-century Spanish mission and Apalachee village
Morningside Nature Center	Gainesville	Florida	Farm	Includes 1870s farm
Silver River Museum	Silver Springs	Florida	Open-air	Includes restored or "newly built" 19th-century farm buildings with a special living history event
Agrirama	Tifton	Georgia	Farm	website, includes five areas: a traditional farm community of the 1870s, an 1890s progressive farmstead, an industrial sites complex, rural town, Peanut Museum, and the Georgia Museum of Agriculture Center
Westville	Lumpkin	Georgia	Living	Recreates an 1850 working town with over 30 buildings
Kona Coffee Living History Farm	Captain Cook	Hawaii	Farm	Depicts the daily lives of early Japanese immigrants during the period of 1920-1945
Polynesian Cultural Center	Lā'ie	Hawaii	Living	
Kline Creek Farm	Winfield	Illinois	Farm	Late 19th-century farm
Lincoln Log Cabin State Historic Site	Lerna	Illinois	Living	1840s farmstead with three historic houses
Lincoln's New Salem State Historic Site	New Salem	Illinois	Living	1830s village
Macktown Living History Education Center	Rockton	Illinois	Living	website, 1830 - 1846 village
Naper Settlement	Naperville	Illinois	Living	19th-century museum village

- Category: Historic districts in the United States by state
