= List of tourist attractions providing reenactment =

The following is a list of tourist attractions, by country, that regularly use "living history" or historical reenactments either with professional actors or amateur groups.

Most castles which open to the public use reenactment, even if not noted on this list. Similarly, anything labeled a Renaissance fair will use reenactment, though the level of authenticity may vary.

== Australasia ==
=== Australia ===
- Sovereign Hill, Ballarat, Victoria

== Europe ==
=== Portugal ===
- Viagem medieval em Terra de Santa Maria in Santa Maria da Feira

=== Belgium ===
- Bokrijk in Genk

=== Denmark ===
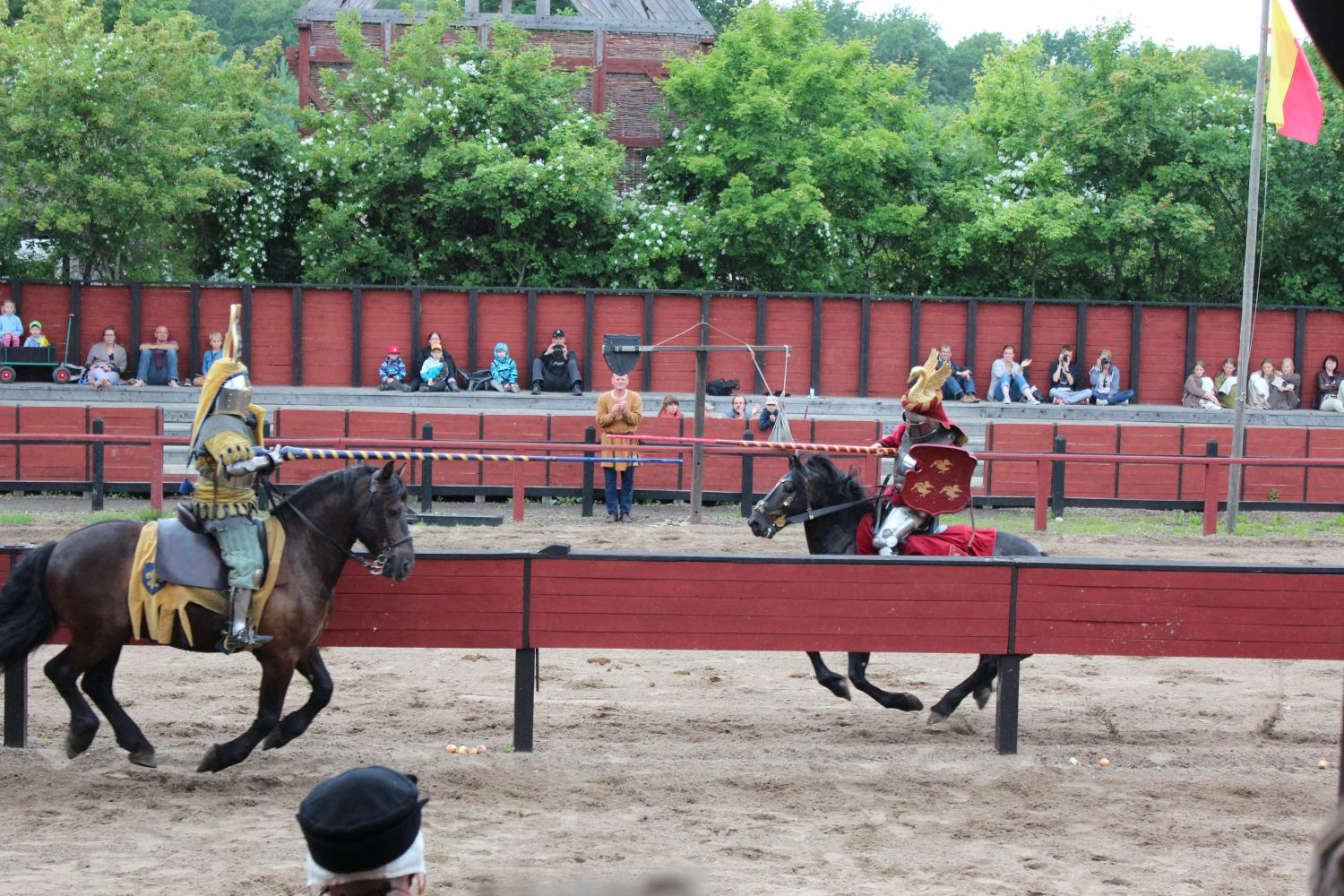
Reenactment jousting at The Middle Ages Center

- The Old Town, Aarhus
- The Middle Ages Center, Falster

=== France ===
- Le Puy du Fou
- Provins Medieval Town
- Arena of Nîmes
- Guédelon Castle
- Château de Castelnaud-la-Chapelle
- Château de Foix
- Castle Site of Montbazon
- Fort-la-Latte
- Carcassonne

=== Germany ===
- Slavic Village Passentin
- Nassau Castle
- German Historical Museum
- Esslingen Market Square in Marktplatz
- Wartburg
- Schloss Burgk
- Spectaculum Worms (medieval festival) in Worms
- Legio XXI Rapax (Roman reenactment group) in Teutoburg

=== Norway ===
- Viking village of Njardarheimr in Gudvangen

=== Sweden ===
- Skansen open-air museum in Stockholm

=== United Kingdom ===
- Alnwick Castle
- Beamish Museum, County Durham, England
- Butser Ancient Farm, Hampshire, England
- Cardiff Castle, Wales
- Cosmeston Medieval Village, Wales
- English Heritage sites
- Festival of History, the largest historical festival in Europe (now defunct)
- Hampton Court
- Jorvik Viking Centre in York, England
- Llancaiach Fawr, Wales
- Kentwell Hall
- Little Woodham, Hampshire, England
- Murton Park / Yorkshire Museum of Farming in Murton, York, England
- National Trust sites
- St Fagan's National Museum of History in Cardiff, Wales

== North America ==
=== United States ===
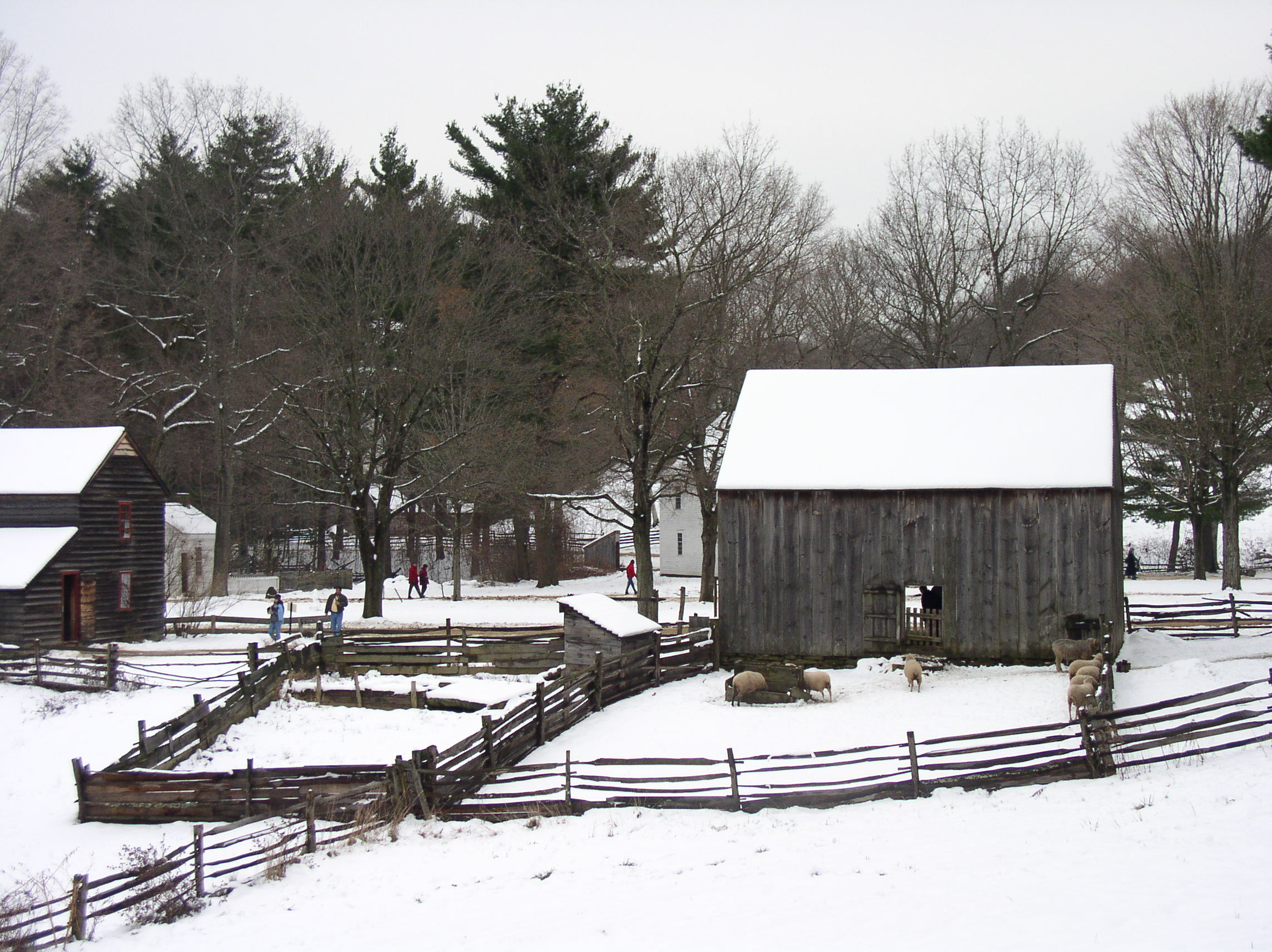
View of the Center Village section of Old Sturbridge Village

- Ardenwood Historic Farm in Fremont, California
- Battle of the Little Bighorn reenactment, Big Horn County, Montana
- Cabrillo National Monument in Point Loma, San Diego, California
- Colonial Pennsylvania Plantation in Ridley Creek State Park, Media, Pennsylvania
- Colonial Spanish Quarter Living History Museum, St. Augustine, Florida
- Colonial Williamsburg, Virginia
- Conner Prairie in Fishers, Indiana
- Ethan Allen Homestead Museum in Burlington, VT'
- Fosterfields Living Historical Farm in Morris Township, New Jersey
- Fort at Number 4, New Hampshire
- Fort Meigs, Perrysburg, Ohio
- Fort Snelling, Minnesota
- Fort Tejon, California
- Fort Ticonderoga, New York
- Fort Western, Maine
- Fort Wilkins, Michigan
- Frazier History Museum, Kentucky
- Frontier Culture Museum of Virginia in Staunton, Virginia
- Grand Ledge, Michigan
- Greenfield Village in Dearborn, Michigan
- Historic Cold Spring Village in Cold Spring, New Jersey
- Historic Richmond Town, New York
- Knott's Berry Farm, Buena Park, California
- Little Bighorn National Monument-Reenactment is known as Custer's Last Stand Reenactment in Crow Agency Montana.
- Maine Forest and Logging Museum, Bradley, Maine
- Living History Farms, Urbandale, Iowa
- Minute Man National Historical Park, Concord, Massachusetts
- Missouri Town 1855, Blue Springs, Missouri
- Monmouth Battlefield State Park in Monmouth County, New Jersey
- Mount Vernon, Mt. Vernon, Virginia
- Mystic Seaport, Connecticut
- Old Salem in Winston-Salem, North Carolina
- Old Sturbridge Village, Massachusetts
- Old World Wisconsin, Wisconsin Ethnic Heritage, Working Farms, 600-acre (2.4 km^{2}) site in Eagle, Wisconsin
- Pilgrim's Progress in Plymouth, Massachusetts
- Plimoth Patuxet in Plymouth, Massachusetts
- Riley's Farm, Oak Glen, California
- The Spanish Military Hospital Museum, Saint Augustine, Florida
- Strawbery Banke, New Hampshire
- Waterloo Village in Byram Township, New Jersey
- Westville, Georgia

=== Canada ===
- Fort Edmonton Park in Edmonton, Alberta
- Fort Henry National Historic Site in Kingston, Ontario
- Fort St. James National Historic Site in Fort St. James, British Columbia
- Fort William Historical Park in Thunder Bay, Ontario
- Heritage Park Historical Village in Calgary, Alberta
- L'Anse aux Meadows in Newfoundland
- Lower Fort Garry in Winnipeg, Manitoba
- Norstead in Newfoundland
- Quebec City, Quebec (Fêtes de la Nouvelle-France)
- Tunnels of Moose Jaw in Moose Jaw, Saskatchewan
- Ukrainian Cultural Heritage Village near Lamont, Alberta
- Upper Canada Village near Morrisburg, Ontario
- Chateau Ramezay in Montreal, Quebec

== Asia ==
=== Japan ===
- Edo Wonderland Nikko Edomura in Nikko, Tochigi

=== Yemen ===
- Sultan Al-Qu'aiti Palace

== See also ==
- List of open-air and living history museums in the United States
- List of historical reenactment events
- List of Renaissance fairs
- Open-air museum
- List of tourist attractions worldwide
