= York City Levy =

British living-history group

- Founded: 1988
- Location: Europe, based in the United Kingdom
- Period: 1460–1490
- Speciality: Daily life
- Number of members: around 20
- Alliances: Livery and Maintenance
- Website: www.yorkcitylevy.com

York City Levy is a living-history group portraying an ordinary men and women from the City of York artillery between the period 1460–1490. The group does events with a civil and military character and is best known for its display of trades and crafts in a medieval camp, together with its mummers' plays, dance and music. The York City Levy also has a strong local history focus and is particularly interested in events in the North-East of England during the period which we now know as the Wars of the Roses.

== Name ==
The name York City Levy refers to the militia of the City of York. In the late Middle Ages, there was no standing army in England, but troops were mustered in times of crisis by nobility and cities alike. Ordinary townsfolk were expected to present for short-term military service in support of specific campaigns when ordered by the city administration.

== Origins and History ==
The York City Levy was formed during the late 1980s around a group of history enthusiasts living in Yorkshire and Northumberland. Traditionally the Levy has been a core member of the umbrella organisation Livery and Maintenance.

== Membership ==
There are around twenty people involved with the group. Membership is open to anyone with an interest in medieval history. The group prides itself on its inclusive nature, and offers children, women and men an equally important role in realistically portraying life in a medieval town. New members can obtain loan clothing and equipment and are provided with substantial help and advice on how to become a great re-enactor.

== Events ==
The York City Levy primarily works in the North-East of England and delivers about 5 to 10 events per year. Prime employers are English Heritage, local museums and heritage organisations.
