= Museum theatre =

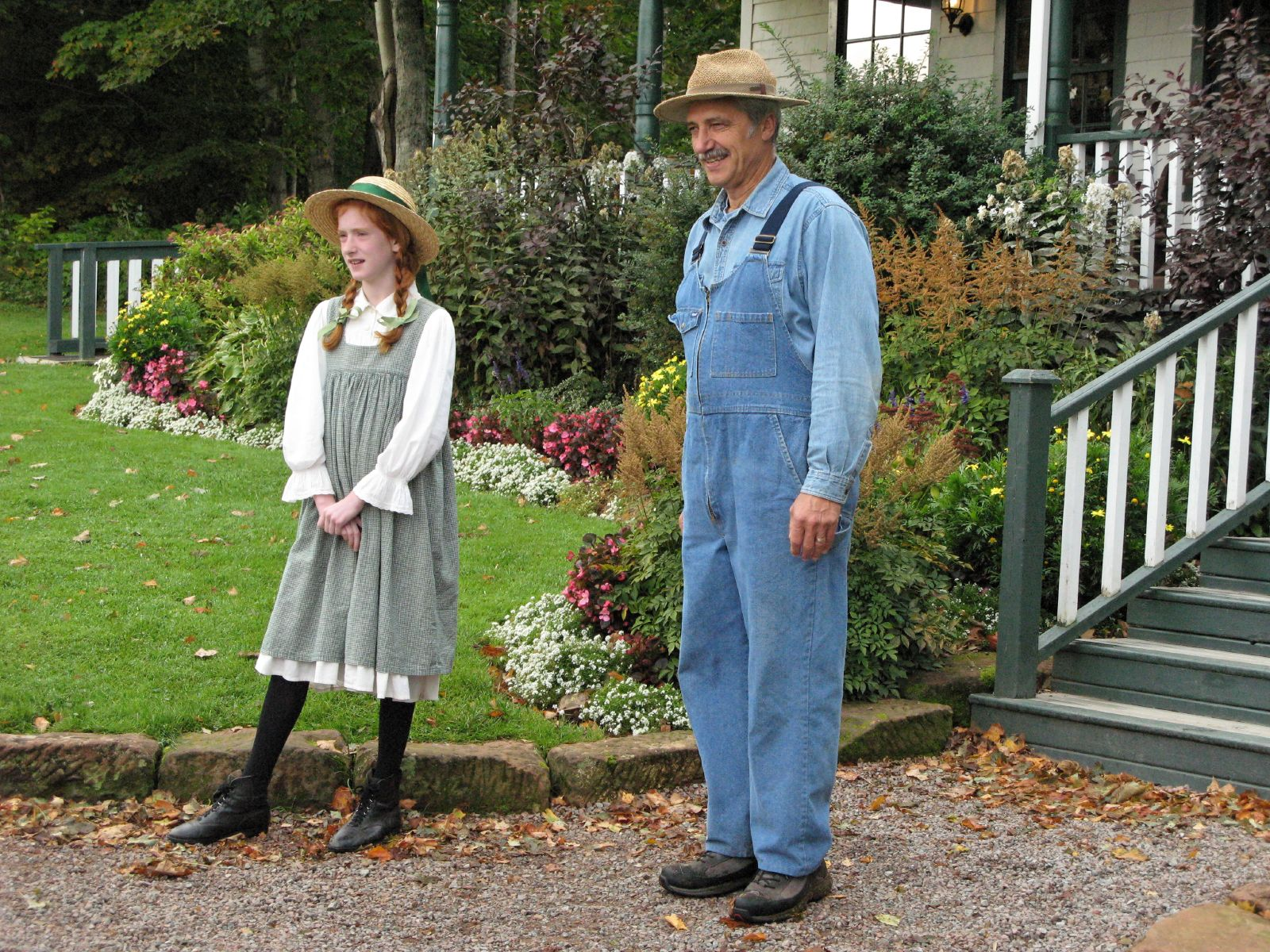
Actors at the Anne of Green Gables museum on Prince Edward Island

Museum theatre is the use of theatre and theatrical techniques by a museum for educational, informative, and entertainment purposes. It can also be used in a zoo, an aquarium, an art gallery, and at historic sites. It is generally performed by professional actors. Varieties of museum theatre include historical characters, puppetry, movement and music.

== Overview ==
Actors portraying historical characters perform in first person, as if he or she were an actual person from the era or culture he or she is representing. With puppetry, actors can tell stories, create multiple characters, and portray a variety of cultures.

Theatrical techniques can be used for third-person interpretation, where an actor or trained presenter uses costumes, props. lighting, or special effects to convey historical or scientific facts, without necessarily portraying a character.

Museum theatre pioneers include the Science Museum of Minnesota, the Museum of Science, Boston, the National Gallery of Art, and the Philadelphia Zoo.

The Theatre in Museums Workshop, begun in 1983 at the Science Museum of Minnesota, is an annual event now held at The Children's Museum of Indianapolis. It provides all the basic information needed to start a theatre program, and an opportunity to develop scripts under the guidance of experienced museum theatre practitioners.

== First-person interpretation ==
First-person interpretation is an increasingly popular way of creating a full-body experience for museum visitors by giving them the opportunity to interact with the past through actors and interpreters.

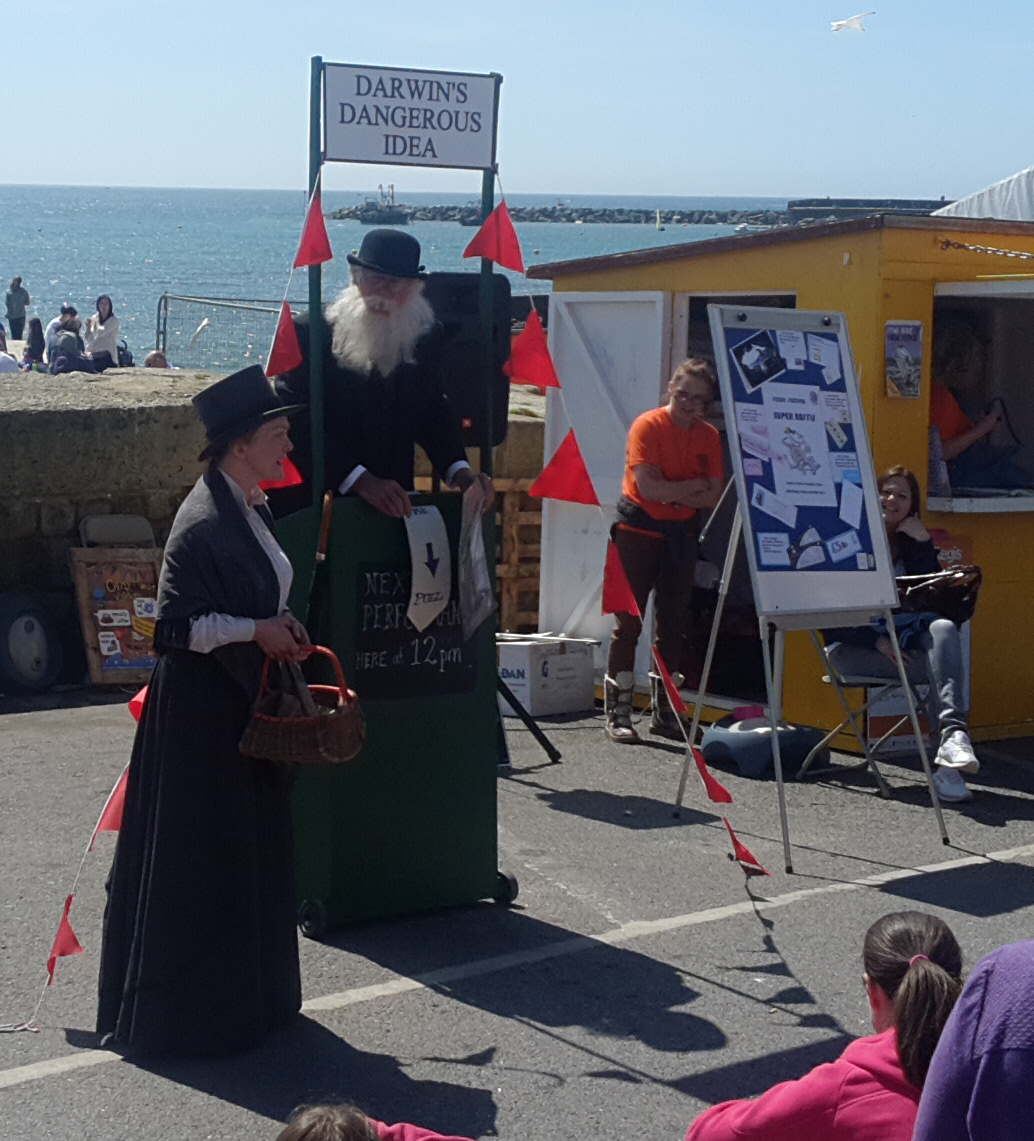
Actors portraying Charles Darwin and Mary Anning at the Lyme Regis fossil festival

Historical character interpretation is increasingly becoming the way all first-person interpretation is performed because it adds a high degree of authenticity to a given museum performance or interpretation. This movement corresponds with the increase in focus on the educational benefit of the museum to the visitor as opposed to the previously held belief that the visitor is a secondary concern to the objects. While this has been a strong movement since about 1980, the concern for accuracy and consequent focus on portraying real people is a marker that can be interpreted as a new stage.

One of the main ways that museum theatre differs from museum interpretation is in the degree of disbelief involved in the performance; representing a historical figure requires less suspension of disbelief because the audience knows that the character being represented did exist. It is easier for an audience to believe that the performer is accurately representing a figure that they themselves can verify existed.

The portrayal of a historical character in a museum environment as opposed to a traditional theatrical space is hard to define. The main distinction is perhaps that the actor in the museum environment must be prepared to interact with the audience, while the stage actor is not expected to know much about his character beyond what is developed on-stage. While acting the characters are subject to similar acting conventions, the museum actor must be prepared to answer to his audience face-to-face. The final distinction to be made is that the portrayal of a historical character is a performance of living history, as opposed to museum theatre. In taking on the identity of a person who truly lived, you are expected to become that person, which involves answering to that person’s actions, ideologies, and life experiences.

== Second-person interpretation ==
Second-person interpretation is a newer form of interpretation in which visitors participate in programming and hands-on activities, as opposed to only engaging in dialogue with interpreters. It is employed most often in living history museums and can be used in conjunction with first- or third-person interpretation. Common hands-on activities include candle-dipping, butter churning, weaving on a loom, and musket loading. This form of second-person interpretation does not necessarily require the visitor to adopt a character or pretend to be part of the past. In another form, more similar to participatory theatre, visitors are invited to adopt a character and interact with interpreters as that character. One example is the "Follow the North Star" program at Conner Prairie Interactive History Park in Indiana, where visitors pretend to be fugitive slaves as a way of learning about the Underground Railroad. Often, such interactions are carefully facilitated so that a desired outcome is achieved, but sometimes visitors are allowed to make their own choices regardless of the historical record. Allowing visitors to portray prominent historical figures and make their own choices is done less frequently because of concerns over historical accuracy. Many educators support role-playing as a way for visitors to learn by doing, think critically about history, and make personal connections between history and their own lives.

== Demonstration ==
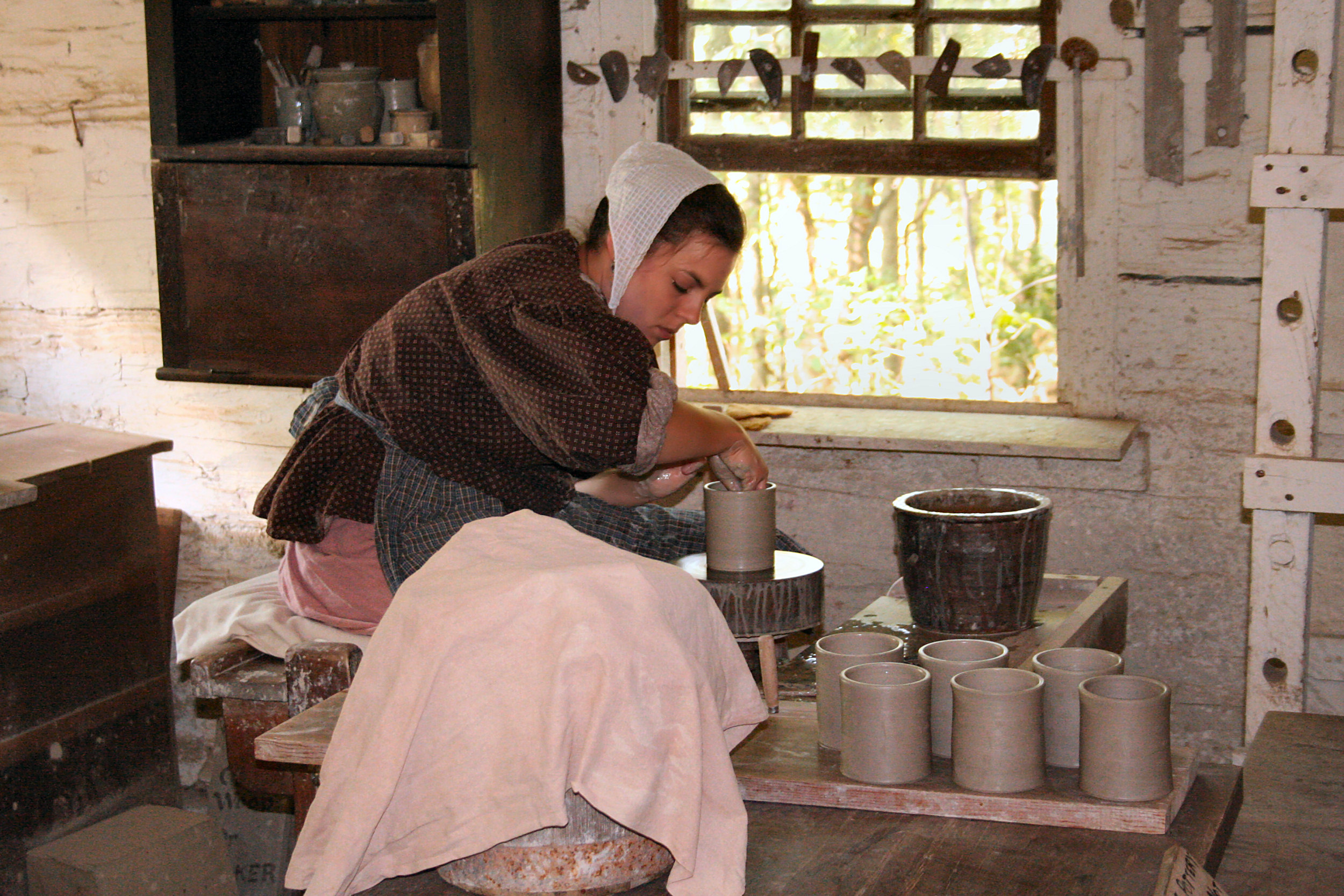
A pottery wheel demonstration at Conner Prairie living history museum.

Demonstration is a form of museum interpretation that has been used in museums, historic sites, zoos, and aquaria for decades. Demonstration is a way to illustrate activities such as historical craft-making and concepts like scientific principles. It is also a way to contextualize a museum object or artifact. In a demonstration, the demonstrator generally explains the activity or concept using something "real" like an object or animal. In traditional demonstrations, the demonstrators generally do not assume to be anyone else (characterization might be involved in more theatrical demonstrations). One example of a demonstration is fish feeding at the New England Aquarium, in which visitors watch a diver feed fish while listening to a volunteer explain the process. Another example is the lightning presentation at the Museum of Science, Boston during which visitors watch lightning flashes produced by a Van de Graaff generator. There is a great deal of overlap between demonstration and theatre. Theatrical techniques such as characterization, costume, narrative, and special effects are often used to enliven demonstration and draw visitor attention. Some museums, such as Science Museum in London, classify demonstration as a form of museum theatre, while other museums, such as the Science Museum of Minnesota, use actors to present demonstrations. Demonstration may also serve as a component of a museum play or theatre piece. However, differences remain between the conventions of demonstration and the conventions of theatre. In her book Exploring Museum Theatre, Tessa Bridal warns museums against promoting a demonstration as a theatre performance, as it may cause visitor confusion or disappointment. Yet like museum theatre and other forms of live interpretation, demonstration aims to engage visitors, to create interest in a topic, to serve as an alternative to lists of facts and static exhibitions, and to provoke an emotional response that leads to learning.

== Storytelling ==
Storytelling is a discipline that has a history as long as the human race. Storytellers inhabit the characters of the tale, while still maintaining the status as narrator of the events, they are both first person and third person perspectives in one. Storytelling can help bring historical and cultural context to works of art, dinosaur bones, scientific and historical objects. For this reason some museums will hire a contract storyteller to add depth and experience to exhibitions or programs by spinning children's tales, appearing as a costume character to aid in an immersive environment and to aid in depicting different cultures by sharing traditions, histories, folklore and myths.

Museum theatre often adapts the archetypal storyteller to a character embodied by a trained and scripted actor. Part of the art of storytelling is the development of the storyteller's persona and their unique style of performing, which is similar to the creation of a character intrinsic to the acting discipline and the theatre genre. Some purists believe that creating a theatrical piece embodying the stories and myths of a culture without the native storyteller present, is a perversion and denigration of cultural patrimony. However, professionals in museum theatre believe that the most important part of creating meaningful experiences using others' stories is that the stories and the culture they represent are handled with respect and every effort is made to portray them accurately.

Despite some detractors museums are beginning to integrate many aspects of museum theatre into their daily programming schedule. This is probably due to recently scholarly discourse in the field of museum education that links multi-sensory experiences like storytelling with effective learning in children and adults. Storytelling is a particularly effective type of museum theatre because children's cognitive and empathetic abilities are increased when they are asked to listen and follow the sequence of events presented by storytellers. To quote Catherine Hughes,

Juxtaposing stories (an ancient way of understanding) and science [or history, or art, etc](a new approach to understanding) creates more models and pictures for the listener, which makes for a deeper, more complex, and complete awareness of the natural world.

== Dance/music performance ==
Dance and music performance within museum theatre take on many different forms. While they can be used separately, dance and music are also used in conjunction with other forms of museum theatre, including each other, to enhance the visitor’s experience. Music as either an instrumental or vocal performance should be performed by qualified performers. The same goes for a dance performance that is either choreographed or improvised. However, in other circumstances, such as after a performance or in a special program, music and dance can be explored by the visitor in a more participatory way. This helps to enhance their understanding and interpretation of the ideas and concepts the museum is trying to encourage.

Even within a performance museums use music and dance in different ways. Music has been used as a cultural performance to show and explore different cultures through the use of music. In other cases music performance has been used to help visitors discover more about the music and instruments themselves, such as the Exploratorium, in San Francisco. They held a series of informal concerts at which, after the musician gave his or her performance, the audience were given the opportunity to converse with the musician and ask question. Dance performance, presented on its own is unusual. It is often used in addition to or as a part of another museum theatre piece. There are however a few sole dance performances in museums. The Weisman holds a performance entitled Eddy that uses the museum building itself as the stage. To help visitors look at the building differently, the dancers move through the space walking up walls, using the elevator as a dance floor, and other unusual ways. The museum wants the visitor to appreciate not only the exhibits in the museum, but the building itself.

When used together dance and music provide another opportunity for museums to educate. A good example of this is The Ballad of Chico Mendes. The Museum of Science, in Boston used choreographed dance and music, both as song and for background, to teach visitors about the battle for the rainforest through the life of Chico Mendes, a rubber tapper. Not only did they perform this in the museum, but latter took it “on the road” to schools in the area.

Using dance and music in museum theatre allows the museum to evoke greater emotion within a performance, connecting to the visitor on a different level. Music especially helps to set the stage of not only a musical or dance performance, but more traditional theatre and program pieces as well.
