= Green Elm School =

Former public school building in Pittsburg, Kansas

Coordinates: 37.3881°N 94.6952°W

Green Elm School is a former public school building which was erected in 1885. It was originally located north of McCune, Kansas, United States and has been moved to the grounds of the George Nettles School in Pittsburg, Kansas to serve as a "living museum". It is part of the Crawford County Historical Museum.
