= Tilly Foster Farm Museum =

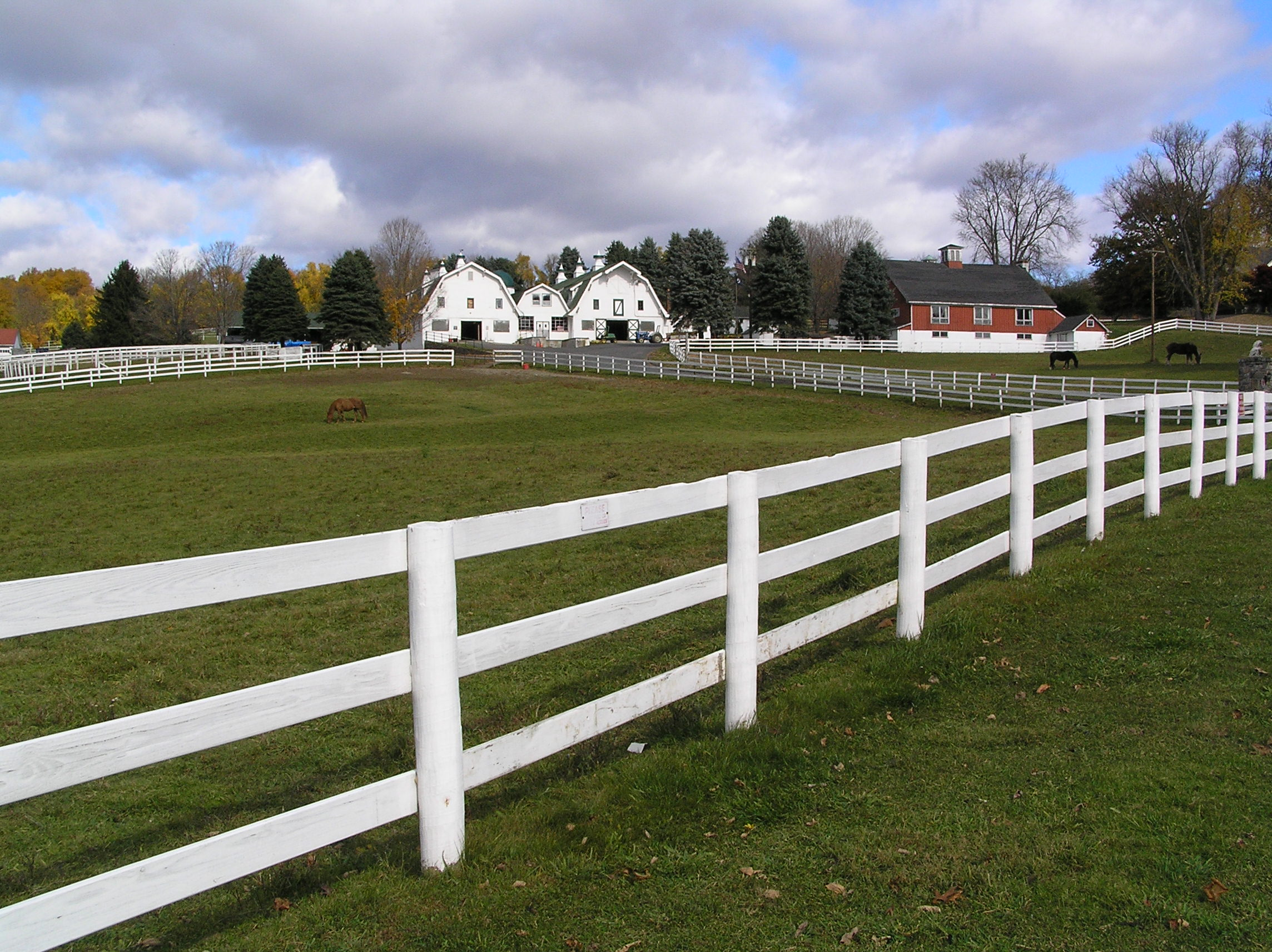
- 2004 image of Tilly Foster Farm
- Location: State Route 312, Brewster
- Coordinates: 41°25′14″N 73°38′11″W
- Type: farm museum
- Collection size: Farm animals, equipment
- Curator: Jeff Hyatt
- Website: putnamtillyfoster.com

The Tilly Foster Farm Museum was a farm museum in Brewster, New York until December 2013. It was run by The Society for the Preservation of Putnam County until 2014 when the organization gave the management of the farm back to Putnam County Government, which owns the property.

== Heritage animals ==
The museum was notable for its rare farm animals including Randall Cattle, donkeys, American rabbits, Pilgrim geese, Indian Runner ducks, and Narragansett turkeys. All of the rare American farm animals have been sold and have vacated the property.

== Other attractions ==
- The Putnam County Antique Machinery Association houses its collections at the Tilly Foster Farm Museum, which include antique farm equipment, tractors, farm implements and gas engines. It remains open at the farm.
- The Avalon Archives Museum is open on weekends. Exhibits include original posters and handbills, photographs and paintings of important concerts and figures in the history of rock and roll. The museum's collections also include vinyl records, video tapes, audio tapes and books on music.
