= Maine Forest and Logging Museum =

Coordinates: 44°52′24″N 68°38′01″W

The Maine Forest and Logging Museum is a non-profit historical museum located in Bradley, Maine. It was founded in 1960 to preserve the history of forestry and logging in the state. Leonard's Mills is the centerpiece of the 1790s living history site which is home to the only operational water wheel powered, up-and-down sawmill in Maine. The museum also has a period blacksmith's shop, stone dam, saw pit, settler's cottage, smokehouse, trapper's hut, log cabin, batteau, hovel, rotary saw mill, shingle machine, clapboard mill, covered bridge, and gift shop. The museum is an open air museum, open daily for self-guided tours, during organized weekend events it is staffed by volunteers. It is adjacent to a forest and the Blackman Stream. The museum recently completed restoring a circa 1907 Lombard Steam Log Hauler. This 20 ton steam traction engine runs several times a year at museum events.

== See also ==
- History of the lumber industry in the United States
