= San Dieguito Heritage Museum =

History museum in Encinitas, California, United States

Coordinates: 33°3′26″N 117°16′48″W

- Established: 1988
- Location: Encinitas, California
- Type: Heritage
- Director: Barbara Grice
- President: Kerry Witkin
- Website: Official Website

San Dieguito Heritage Museum is a history museum in Encinitas, California, United States. Founded in 1988, the museum displays historical photographs and artifacts from Encinitas and the entire San Dieguito area. San Dieguito historically comprises seven communities: Cardiff-by-the-Sea, Del Mar, Encinitas, Leucadia, Olivenhain, Rancho Santa Fe, and Solana Beach in the North County area of San Diego County and their adjacent areas, including parts of southern Carlsbad and northwestern San Diego. The museum is a nonprofit organization, primarily staffed by volunteers with limited paid staff.

It is supported by contributions from its members and the wider community at large. In 1993, the museum published San Dieguito Heritage by Maura Wiegand (ISBN 9780963592606). In 1998, the museum received a $5,000 challenge grant from the Thomas C. Ackerman Foundation. In 2007, the Rotarians helped the museum improve its new location. The museum regularly provides visiting third-grade school groups with a special local history tour geared to their state-mandated curriculum. Several special events, including an old-fashioned community barbecue, are held during the year.

== History ==
In May 2008, the museum opened a ground-breaking new exhibit on skateboarding in the San Dieguito area. It was the first exhibit of its kind in southern California. The most recent exhibit is the Bumann Ranch Exhibit. It will celebrate the placement of the Bumann Ranch on the National Register of Historic Places and the contributions of the Bumanns to record and preserve the history of the Colony of Olivenhain in the San Dieguito region.

== Picture gallery ==
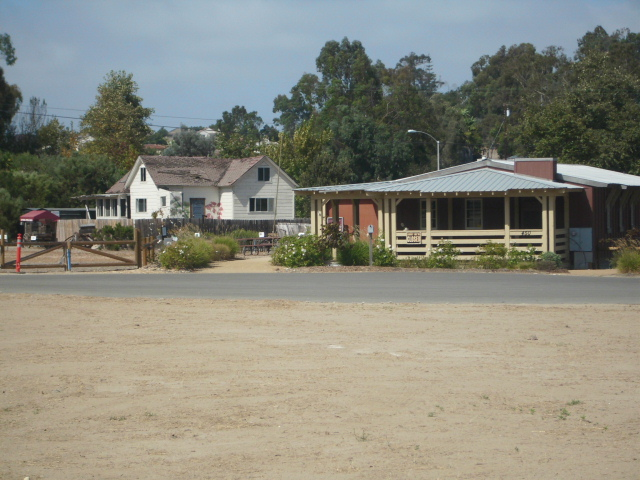

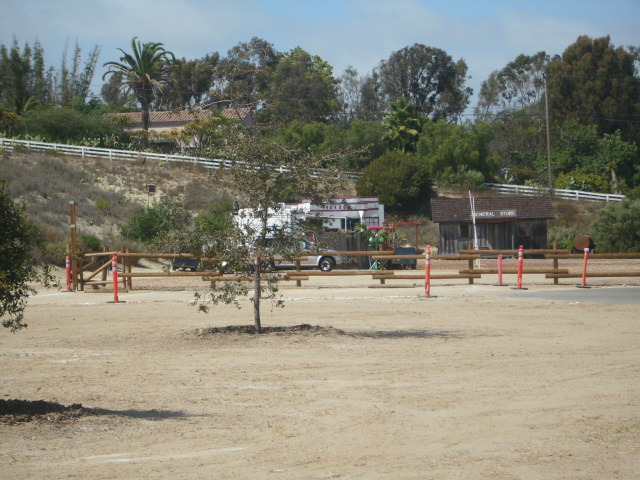

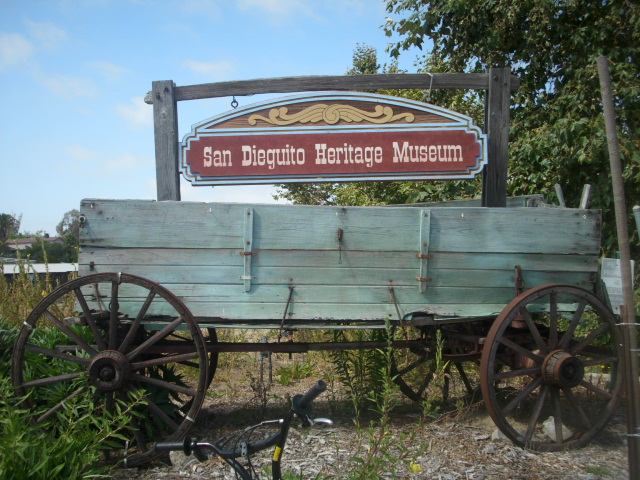

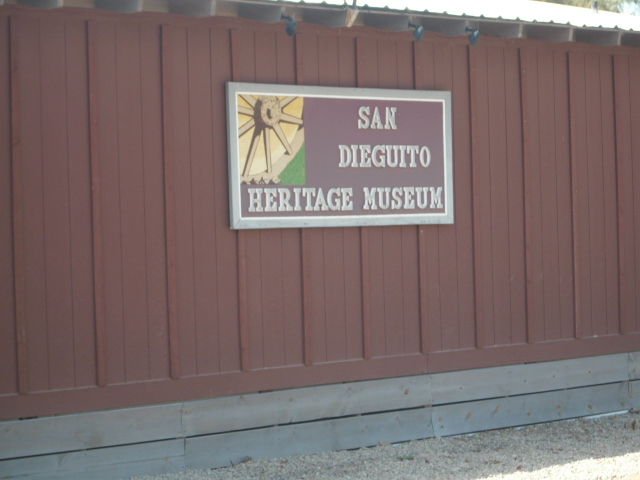

== Historic Encinitas Photo Slide Show ==
Historic Encinitas Photo Slide Show
