= Living museum =

Type of museum

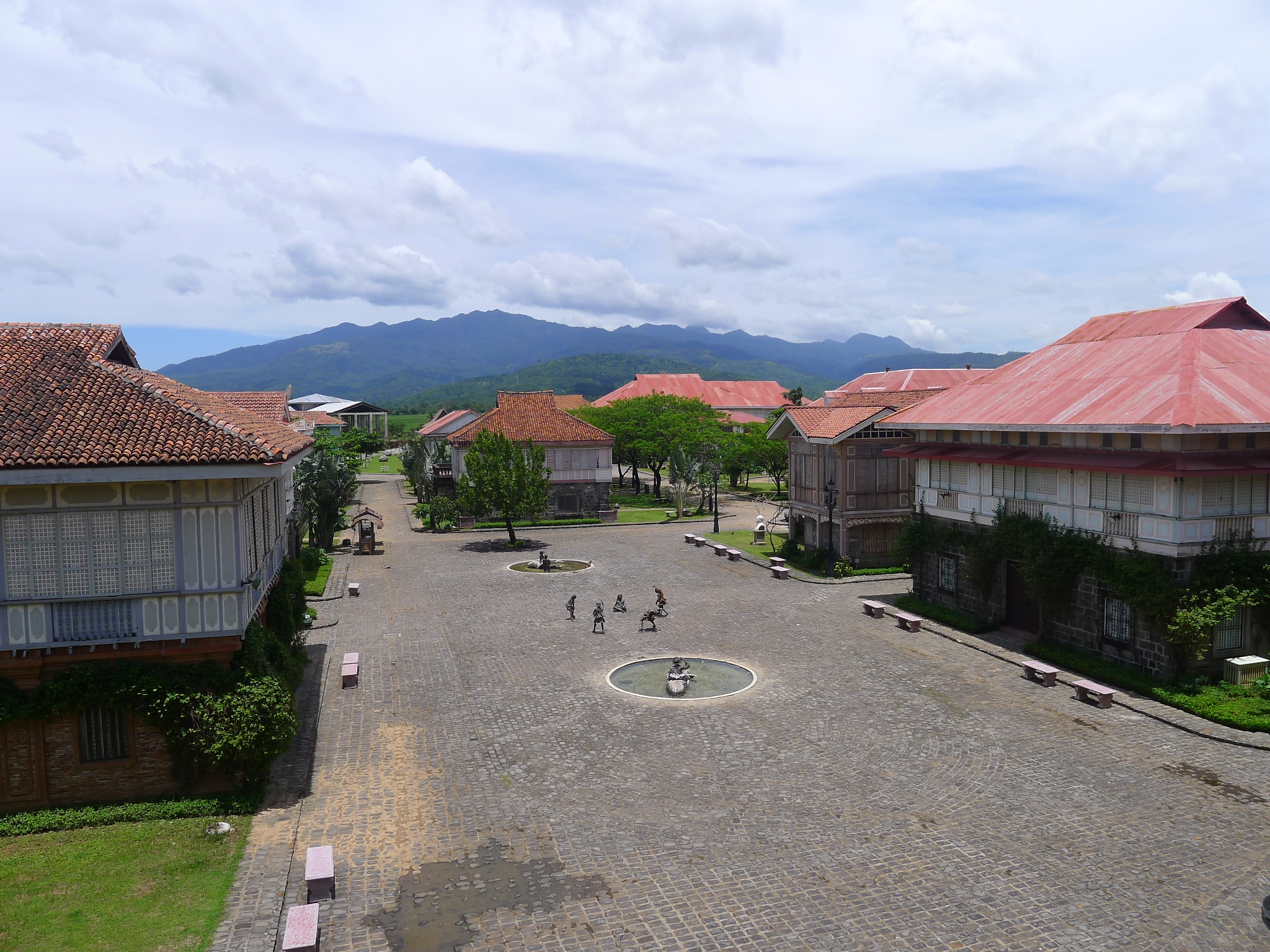
Restored Filipino heritage houses in Las Casas Filipinas de Acuzar

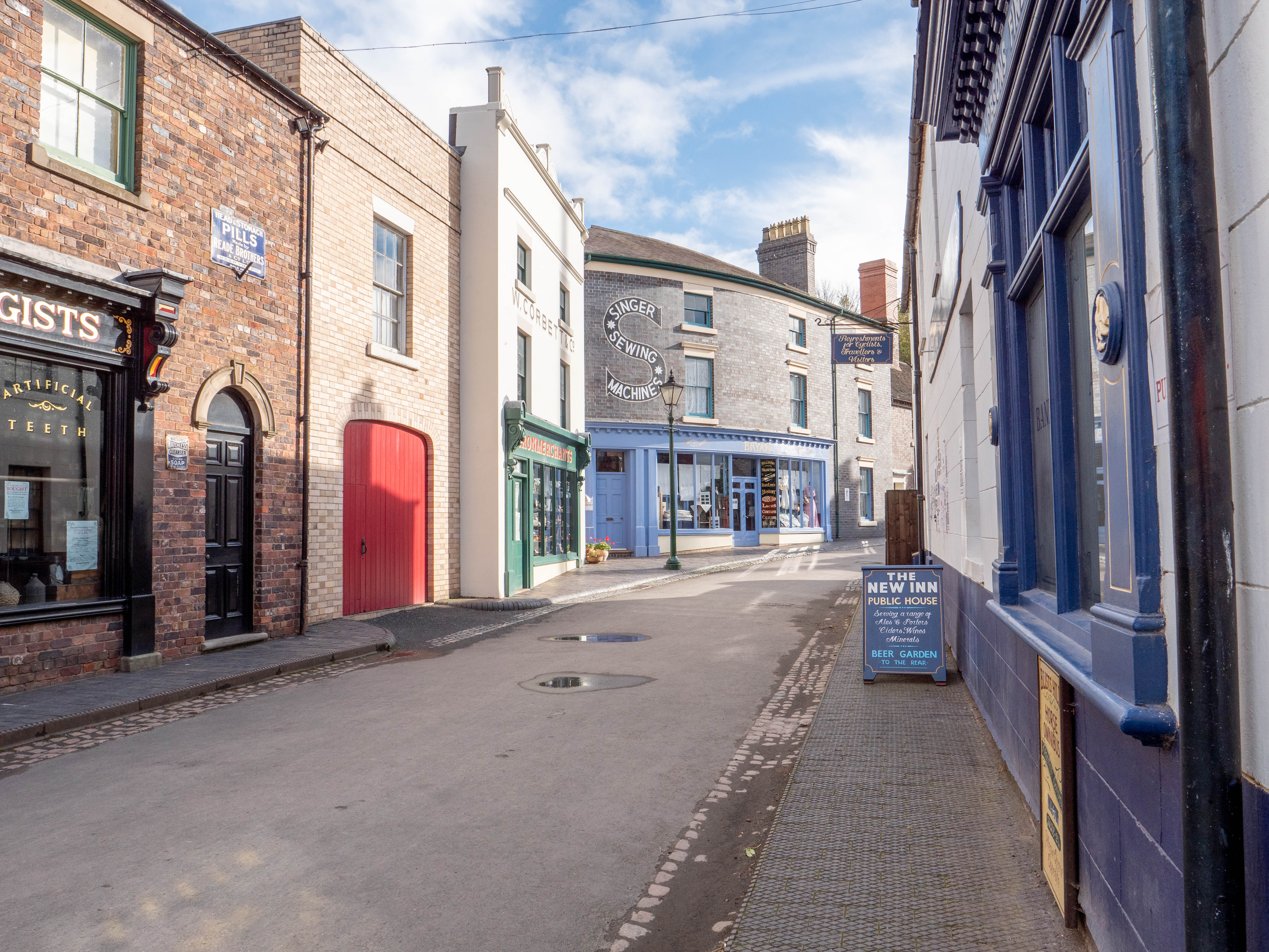
'Canal Street' at Shropshire's Blists Hill Victorian Town living museum

A living museum, also known as a living history museum, is a type of museum which recreates historical settings to simulate a past time period, providing visitors with an experiential interpretation of history. It is a type of museum that recreates to the fullest extent conditions of a culture, natural environment or historical period, in an example of living history.

== Costumed historians ==
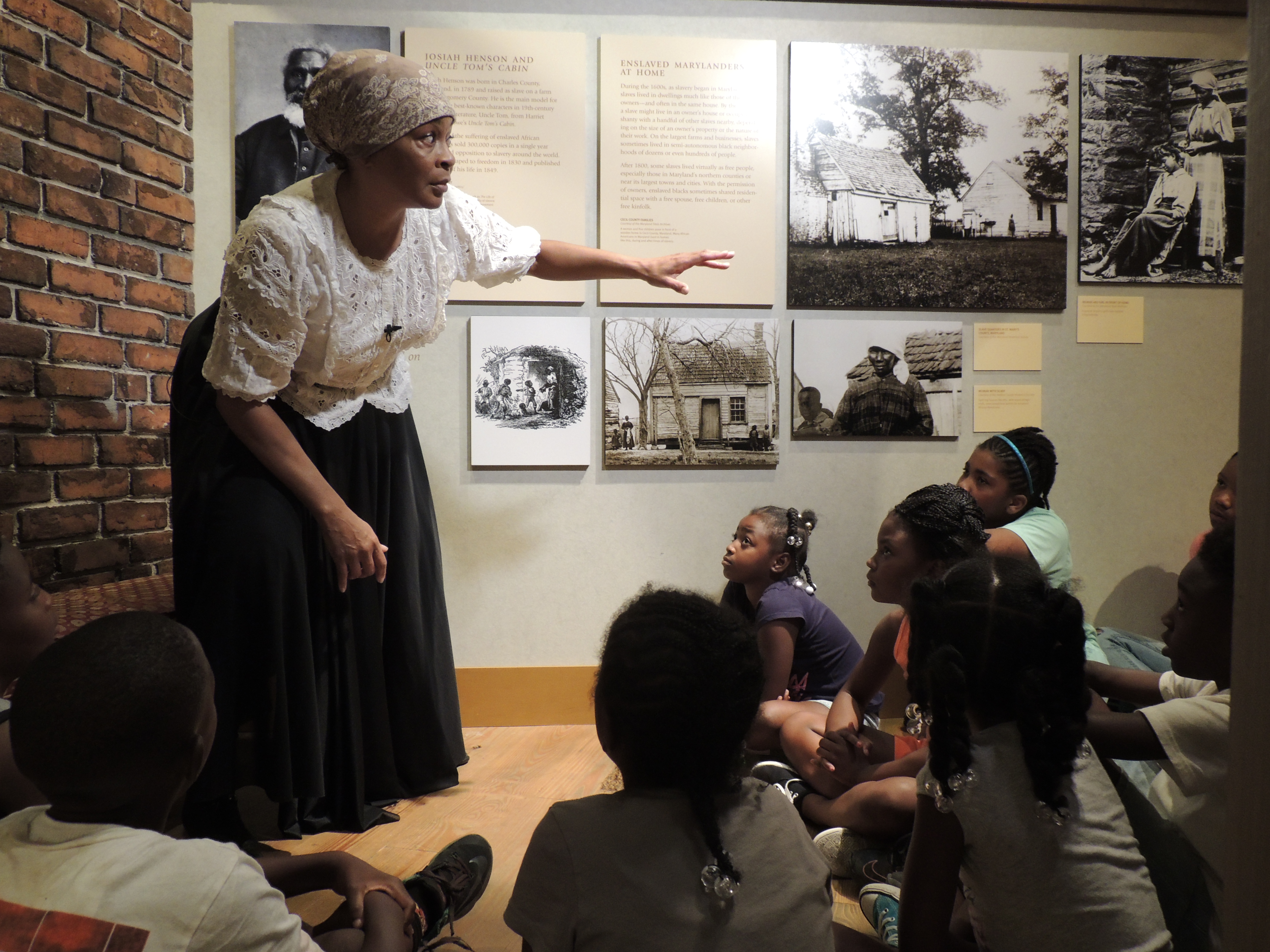
A costumed historian speaking to children at the Reginald F. Lewis Museum

A costumed historian has many roles and responsibilities at historical sites. In addition to conducting tours, interpreting a space, or portraying a historical character, they are also involved in the research process that aides the site interpretation. Full-time staff interpreters develop public programs, tours, and write scripts for interpretative panels, pamphlets, and videos. They often work closely with the curatorial and educational staff to collaborate on ideas about collection tours, school tours, educational programs, and site interpretation. Supervisors are also responsible for the extensive training of new staff members, volunteers, and interns.

As a career, historical interpretation positions do not usually require the applicant to have a specific degree or background. Prospective employers are looking for interpreters who have good communication skills and are comfortable speaking in front of large audiences. They should also possess strong research and writing skills. While a master's degree is not usually required, a background or degree in history, public history, museum studies, or education is beneficial. The average salary for full-time museum workers in the United States was $44,430 in 2019. A large part of the competencies acquired by the interpreter are gained through experience and on-the-job-training at each individual site.

== Interpretation ==
The main interpretative technique of living history museums, aside from exhibitions, are the use of costumed interpreters or historians. Costumed historians make history come alive through interactions that formulate social, cultural, and political connections with the past. There are two different types of costumed interpretation utilized at living history sites: first-person and third-person interpretation.

In first-person interpretation, the costumed historian portrays a specific historical character. The historian adopts speech patterns, mannerisms, worldviews, and attitudes appropriate to the character being portrayed. Since the interpreters are representing a historical character during a particular time period, their knowledge and therefore how they interact with the public, is limited to their designated character and historic time period. For example, interpreters at the English Village at Plimoth Patuxet are first-person interpreters who portray some of the original residents of Plymouth Colony. For example, a costumed historian will say that "I am making cornbread".

Third-person interpretation does not limit the costumed historian to a particular historical character or time period and maintain a working knowledge of both the past and present. Instead, they represent a gender, status, and occupation. Plimoth Patuxet employs third-person interpretation at the Wampanoag Homesite where, although dressed in historically accurate clothing, the costumed historians speak from a modern perspective about Wampanoag history and culture. For example, a costumed historian will say that "They ate a healthy, seasonally varied diet that included corn, beans, squash, fish, venison, fruit, and vegetables".

Both first- and third-person costumed historians participate in demonstrating and performing daily tasks and crafts of the time period. Most interpreters at living history sites have a background in history, public history, museum studies, or education, and conduct significant historical research in order to effectively and accurately provide interpretation to the public.

Freeman Tilden, a National Park Service Interpreter known as the father of interpretation, wrote Interpreting Our Heritage in 1957. His book is one of the first comprehensive instructional texts on the subject of interpretation and outlines six basic interpretative principles that are still taught today in interpretive training sessions nationwide. The six principles of interpretation are:

1. interpretation that does not somehow relate to what is on display or being described to enhance the visitor experience will be sterile,
2. information is not interpretation but all interpretation includes information,
3. interpretation is teachable art,
4. the main aim of interpretation is not instruction, but provocation,
5. interpretation should aim to present a whole instead of simply a part, and
6. interpretation geared toward children should follow a fundamentally different approach rather than a dilution of the presentation given to adults.

== Scholarship ==
Scholars and museum professionals have done significant work exploring the different interpretation styles, how the museum presents and explains the role of the costumed historian, and how the interaction between visitor and costumed interpreter impacts the visitor's overall museum experience. Jay Anderson, in his 1984 book, Time Machines: The World of Living History, defines living history as an “attempt by people to simulate life in another time” and stresses its importance within American culture. He argues that living history museums function as powerful “time machines” that transport visitors both mentally and emotionally into the past for a unique learning experience. Anderson divides the recreated historical experience enacted at living history museums into three categories based on their purpose and outcome: educational for museum purposes, research for archaeological inquiries, and recreation for entertainment.

== Authenticity ==
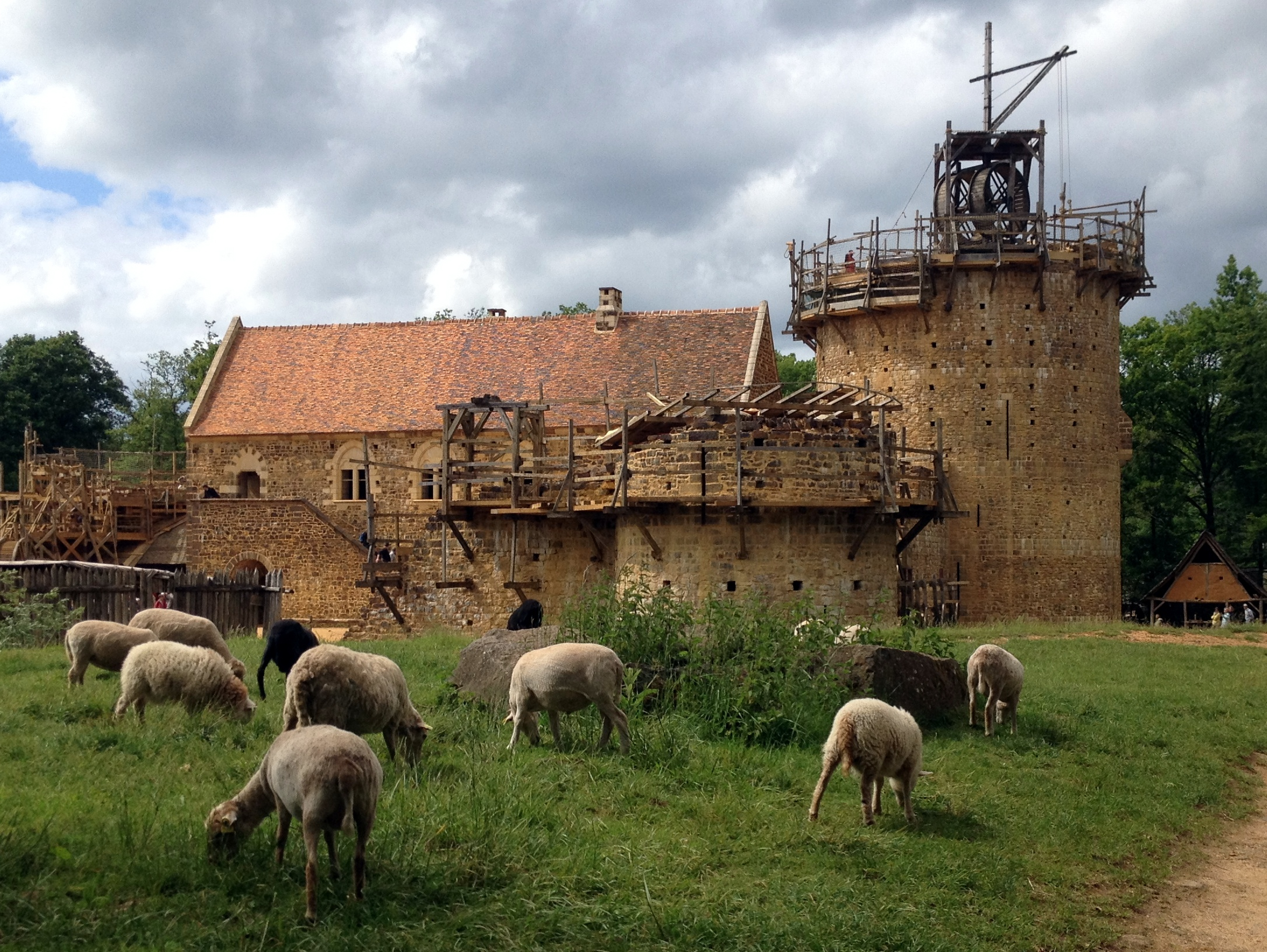
The Guédelon Castle in France is a castle currently built using only medieval construction techniques, tools, costumes and local materials.

A major concern at living history museums is the idea of authenticity. Living historians define authenticity as perfect simulation between a living history activity and the piece of the past it is meant to re-create. A major difference between living history museums and other historical interpretation is that at living history sites, the interpretation is usually given in the first-person present, versus the third-person past narratives given at other sites. Living history museums seek to convey to visitors the experience of what it felt like to live in the past. Critics of living history museums argue that replication of past states of mind is impossible, and therefore living history is inherently inaccurate.

The relative authenticity of living history farms varies significantly. At its best, they most accurately reflect the past appropriate to the time period while at their worst they may portray gross inaccuracies in an attempt to portray a certain idealized image. One such example is Wichita's Old Cowtown Museum, which in its small, rural representation of Wichita resembles Western movies and Wild West myths more than the bustling urban city that Wichita quickly became. This living history narrative developed because of the availability of small historical buildings and inaccurate replicas, prodding from the city, and the influence of Hollywood. Museum professionals must grapple with these issues of conflicting audience and institutional needs which impact the overall structure of living history. Living history museums have also been criticized for their ability to teach, particularly from those that believe "living history is antiquarian, idyllic, or downright misleading." In response to this question, the Association for Living History, Farm, and Agricultural Museums (ALHFAM) has stated that they distinguish between an unchanging past and an interpretation of a constantly changing past. It additionally was affirmed by the ALHFAM that they also support Dr. Scott Magelssen's idea that living history museums produce history as others do, such as teachers in classrooms, authors in monographs, and even directors in film.

== See also ==
- List of open-air and living history museums
  - List of open-air and living history museums in the United States
- Historical reconstruction
- Human zoo
