= Living history =

Historical reenactment

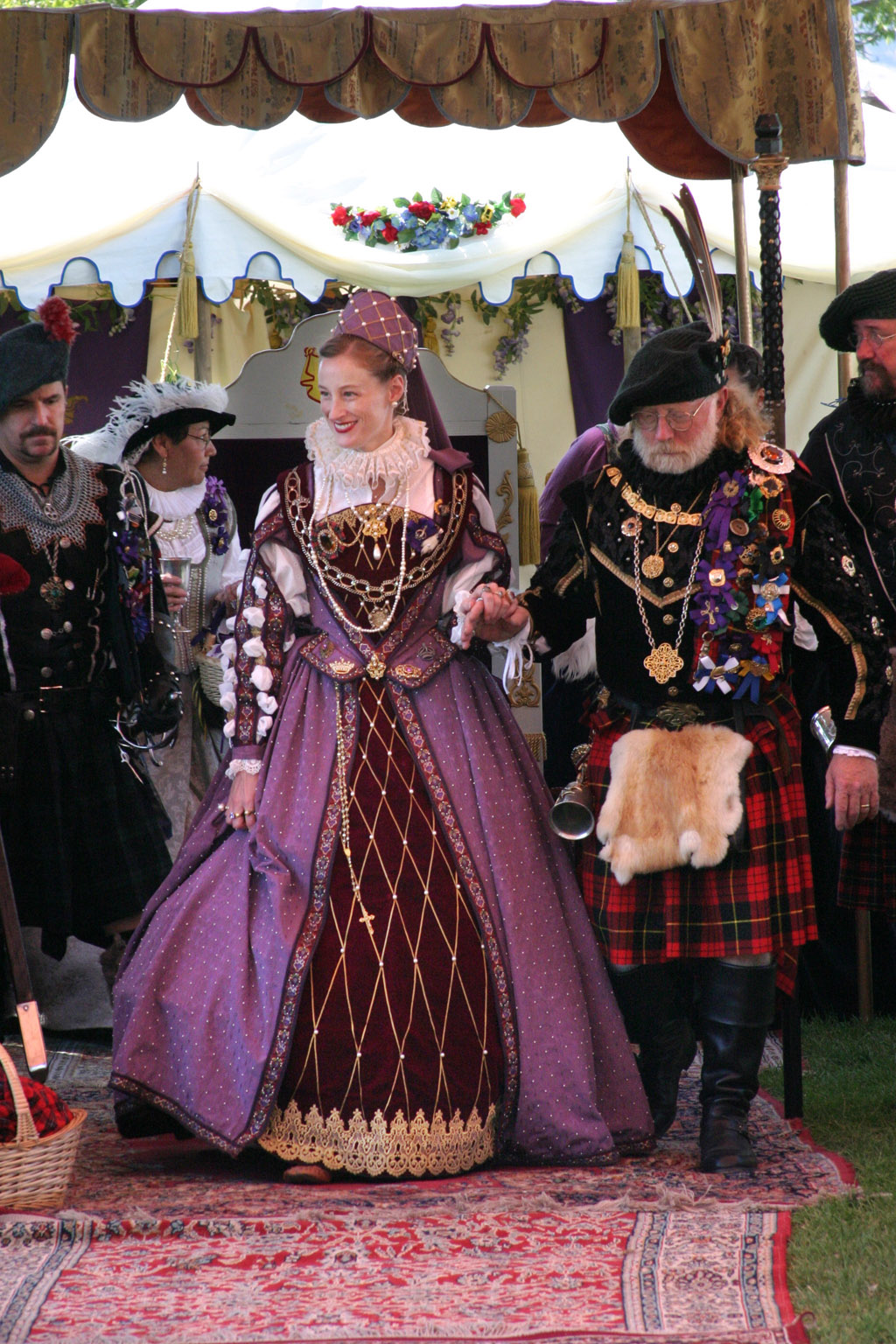
A reenactress playing the role of Mary Queen of Scots at a Scottish fair in 2003.

Living history is an activity that incorporates historical tools, activities and dress into an interactive presentation that seeks to give observers and participants a sense of stepping back in time. Although it does not necessarily seek to reenact a specific event in history, living history is similar to, and sometimes incorporates, historical reenactment. Living history is an educational medium used by living history museums, historic sites, heritage interpreters, schools and historical reenactment groups to educate the public or their own members in particular areas of history, such as clothing styles, pastimes and handicrafts, or to simply convey a sense of the everyday life of a certain period in history. Living history can also be applied to commercial environments such as Renaissance fairs, where emphasis is often placed on entertainment value rather than complete historical accuracy.

== Background ==
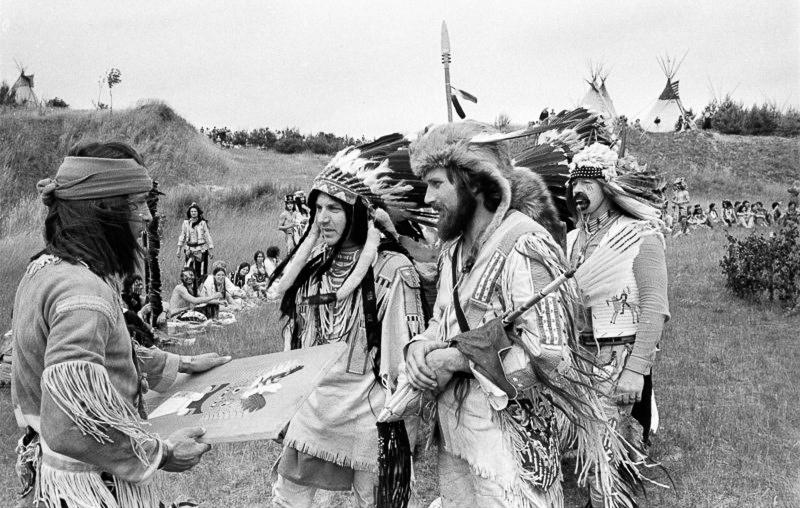
Eastern German Living history at an "Indianistikmeeting" 1982 in Schwerin

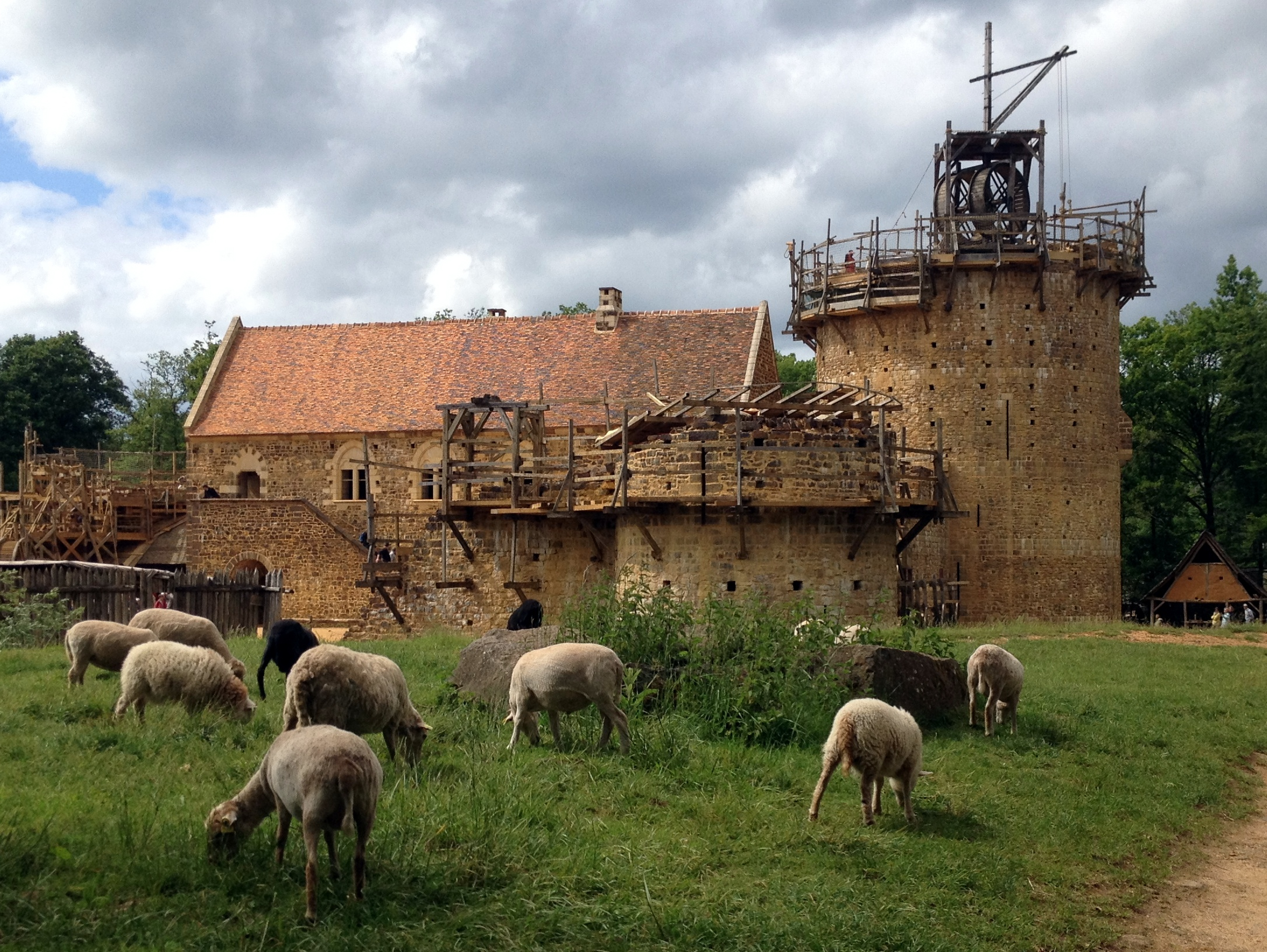
The Guédelon Castle in France is a castle currently being built using only medieval construction techniques, tools, costumes and local materials.

Living history's approach to gain authenticity is less about replaying a certain event according to a planned script as in other reenactment fields. It is more about an immersion of players in a certain era, to catch, in the sense of Walter Benjamin the "spiritual message expressed in every monument's and every site's own 'trace' and 'aura'", even in the Age of Mechanical Reproduction.

=== Early examples ===
An early example of the spiritual and futuristic side of living history can be found in Guido von List's book Der Wiederaufbau von Carnuntum (1900), which suggested rebuilding the Roman Carnuntum military camp in Vienna's neighborhood as a sort of amusement park (compare Westworld). List, himself a right-wing neopagan, asked his staff of landlords, waiters and rangers to be dressed in historical gear. He also asked to have any visitors re-dressed in costumes and described rituals to signify "in-game" and "out-game" status to enhance the immersion experience. E.g. the role of the garment is of interest till today.

=== Contemporary practices ===
The term "living history" describes the performance of bringing history to life for the general public in a rather freewheeling manner. The players are less confined in their actions, but often have to stay at a certain place or building. Historical presentation includes a continuum from well-researched attempts to recreate a known historical event for educational purposes, through representations with theatrical elements, to competitive events for purposes of entertainment. The line between amateur and professional presentations at living history museums can be blurred, as is the distinction between live action role-playing games.

While professional living history presentations routinely use museum professionals and trained interpreters to help convey the story of history to the public, some museums and historic sites employ living history groups with high standards of authenticity for the same role at special events. Such events do not necessarily include a mock battle but aim at portraying the life, and more importantly the lifestyle, of people of the period. This often includes both military and civilian impressions. Occasionally, storytelling or acting sketches take place to involve or explain the everyday life or military activity to the viewing public. More common are craft and cooking demonstrations, song and leisure activities, and lectures. Combat training or duels can also be encountered even when larger combat demonstrations are not present.

=== National and regional variations ===
In the United States, on the National Park Service land, NPS policy "does not allow for battle reenactments (simulated combat with opposing lines and casualties) on NPS property." There are exceptions, such as Saylors Creek, Gettysburg. These are highly controlled with exacting safety standards, as well as exacting historical truths.

In Germany, medieval reenactment is usually associated with living history and renaissance fairs and festivals, which are found in many cities. One such example is the Peter and Paul festival in Bretten. the Landshut Wedding or the Schloss Kaltenberg knights tournament. The majority of combat reenactment groups are battlefield reenactment groups, some of which have become isolated due to a strong focus on authenticity.

Events with the professional reenactment group Ulfhednar lead to a controversy in German archaeology. The German Polish living history group was supported by large museums and scholars, and since 2000 has largely coined the image of early history in Germany and worldwide. Among others, a paper with the programmatic title Under the crocheted Swastika, Germanic Living History and rightwing affects started the dispute in 2009. On the other hand, Communist Eastern Germans had problems with accepting "Indianistic" living history reenactors, a widespread variety in Eastern Germany that were closely monitored by security forces. That sort of "second-hand" living history is also part of western German folklore and attempts a high level of authenticity.

== Activities ==
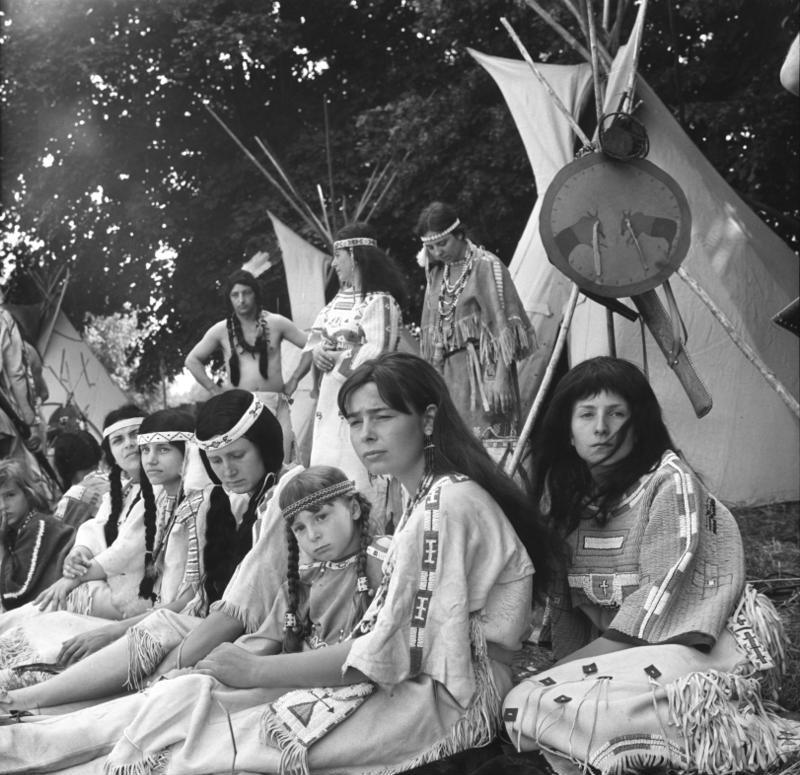
1970 Mandan Indian real history event in Taucha, near Leipzig, Eastern Germany

Activities may be confined to wearing period dress and explaining relevant historical information. In first-person interpretation, an interpreter presents a historical character in role and generally remains in character, without acknowledging events after that person's time; in third-person interpretation, an interpreter may wear historical costume but speaks from a present-day perspective.

Living history portrayal often involves demonstrating everyday activities such as cooking, cleaning, medical care, or particular skills and handicrafts. Depending on the historical period portrayed, these might include spinning, sewing, loom weaving, tablet weaving, inkle weaving or tapestry weaving, cloth dyeing, basket weaving, rope making, leather-working, shoemaking, metalworking, glassblowing, woodworking or other crafts. Considerable research is often applied to identifying authentic techniques and often recreating replica tools and equipment.

== Presentation ==
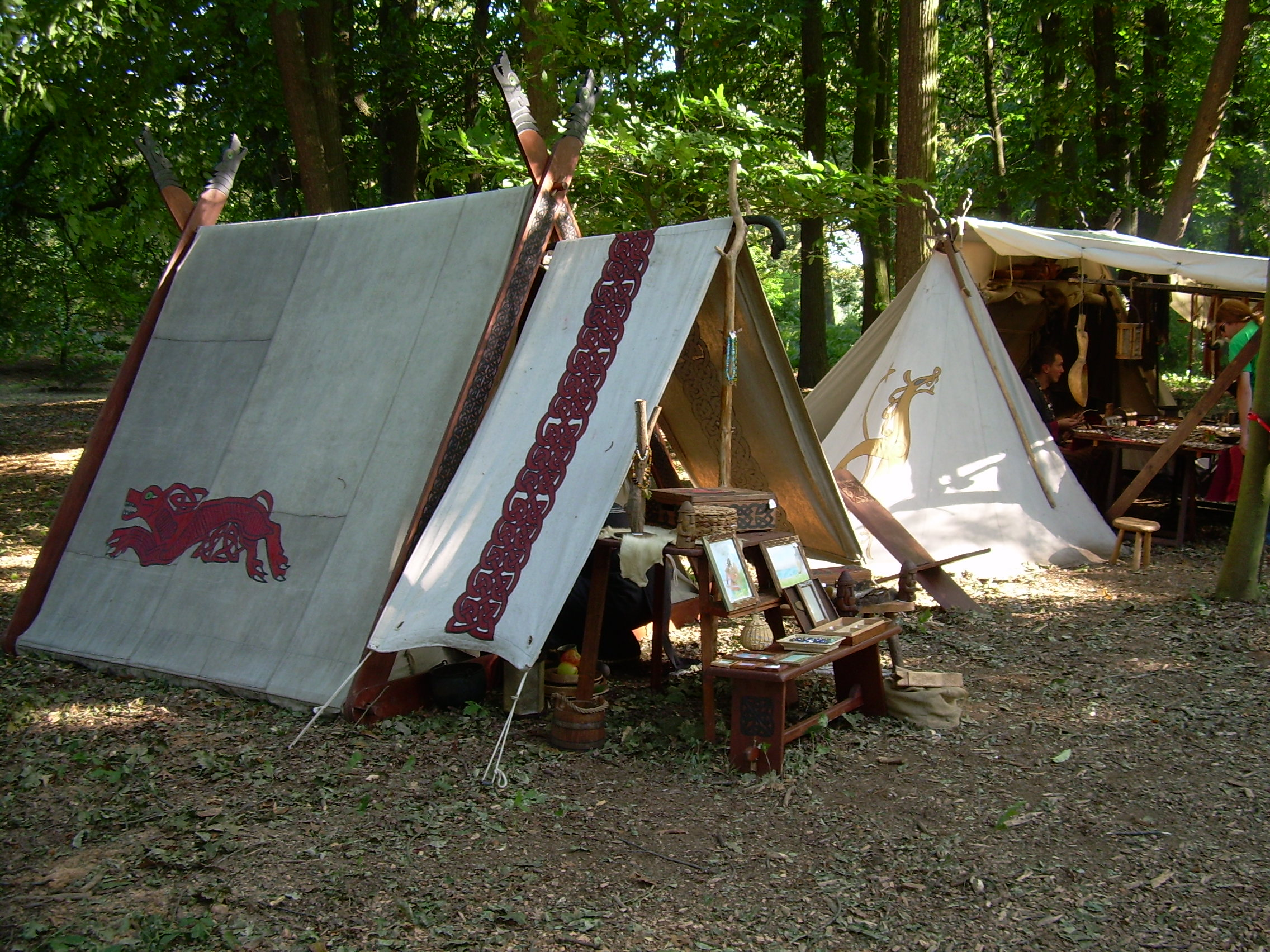
A Viking encampment.

Historical reenactment groups often attempt to organize such displays in an encampment or display area at an event, and have a separate area for combat reenactment activities. While some such exhibits may be conducted in character as a representation of typical everyday life, others are specifically organized to inform the public and so might include an emphasis on handicrafts or other day-to-day activities, which are convenient to stage and interesting to watch, and may be explained out of character. During the 1990s, reenactment groups, primarily American Civil War groups, began to show interest in this style of interpretation and began using it at their reenactments.

== In education ==
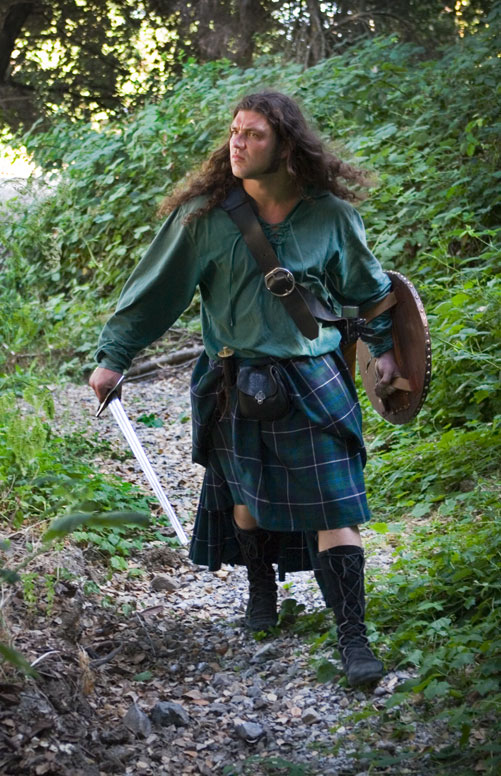
A reenactor from a living history group.

Abraham Lincoln in the present time.

As David Thelen has written, many Americans use the past in their daily lives, while simultaneously viewing the place where they often encounter history – the school – with varying levels of distrust and disconnectedness. Living history can be a tool used to bridge the gap between school and daily life to educate people on historical topics. Living history is not solely an objective retelling of historical facts. Its importance lies more in presenting visitors with a sense of a way of life, than in recreating exact events, accurate in every detail.

Many factors contribute to creating a setting in which visitors to living history sites can become active participants in their historical education. Two of the most important are the material culture and the interpreters. Material culture both grounds the audience in the time and place being portrayed, and provides a jumping-off point for conversation. "Interpreters" are the individuals who embody historical figures at living history sites. It is their responsibility to take the historical research that has been done on the sites and decide what meaning it has. These meanings are often a melding of fact and folklore.

Folklore is an important aspect of living histories because it provides stories which visitors relate to. Whether it is an interpreter embodying a past individual's personal story or discussing a superstition of the time, these accounts allow the audience to see these past figures not as names on a page, but as actual people. However, folklore is also more than stories. Objects, such as dolls or handmade clothing among others, are considered "folk artifacts", which are grouped under the heading of "material culture".

Individuals can participate in living histories as a type of experiential learning in which they make discoveries firsthand, rather than reading about the experience of others. Living history can also be used to supplement and extend formal education. Collaborations between professional historians who work at living history sites and teachers can lead to greater enthusiasm about studying history at all grade levels. Many living history sites profess a dedication to education within their mission statements. For instance, the motto of Colonial Williamsburg, "That the Future May Learn from the Past", proclaims the site's commitment to public edification, as does the portion of the website created for the sole purpose of aiding teachers in instruction on the village.

Certain educators, such as James Percoco in his Springfield, Virginia, high school class, have chosen to integrate public history into their curricula. Since 1991, Percoco has led a class entitled "Applied History", in which his students have contributed over 20,000 hours of service to various public history institutions. Formal education can help visitors interpret what they see at living history sites. By providing a structured way of looking at living histories, as well as questions to think about during visits, formal education can enrich the experience, just as living histories can enrich learning in the classroom.

Some museums such as Middelaldercentret in Denmark or the Netherlands Open Air Museum in the Netherlands provide living history for school children as a part of their education.

== See also ==
- Historical reenactment
- List of historical reenactment events
- List of historical reenactment groups
- List of open-air and living history museums in the United States
- List of tourist attractions providing reenactment
- Open-air museum
