= Peck Farm Park =

Historic farmsite in Geneva, Illinois

Coordinates: 41°52′05″N 88°21′39″W

- Interactive map of Peck Farm Park
- Nearest city: Geneva, Illinois
- Area: 385 acres (156 ha)
- Created: 1998

Peck Farm Park is a 385-acre park in Geneva, Illinois. It is a part of the Geneva Park District and open to the public year-round. Peck Farm Park includes the historic Peck House, an observation tower in a converted silo, two original barn structures that serve as rental spaces, and the Stephen Persinger Recreation Center. There are also several miles of paved and natural surface trails that run through the dolomite and tallgrass prairie.

== History ==
Eli Peck, his wife Jerusha, and two children moved from Sandgate, Vermont to Batavia, Illinois in 1843. They initially began their travel on horse-drawn wagon, however one of the two horses died enroute and they completed their journey via steamboat from Oswego, NY to Chicago.

The original 80-acre property in Geneva Township that would become the Peck farmstead was purchased on April 4, 1844 for $220 by Eli Peck. An additional 80 acres was purchased in 1845 with subsequent acquisitions totaling 1600 acres at the time of Eli's death in 1892.

The Peck family participated in various farming operations, the raising of purebred Merino sheep being the most prominent. The first 50 ewes were purchased in 1869 and by 1892 the Peck family had a flock of 1,800 sheep. Following World War I, the price of wool declined as synthetic fabrics were introduced in the textile industry and the Peck family would transition to raising cattle, growing corn, and soybeans. The property on which the Peck farm sits was donated to preserve the land in the early 1990s and was dedicated by the Geneva Park District as Peck Farm Park Interpretive Center in 1998.

== The Peck House ==
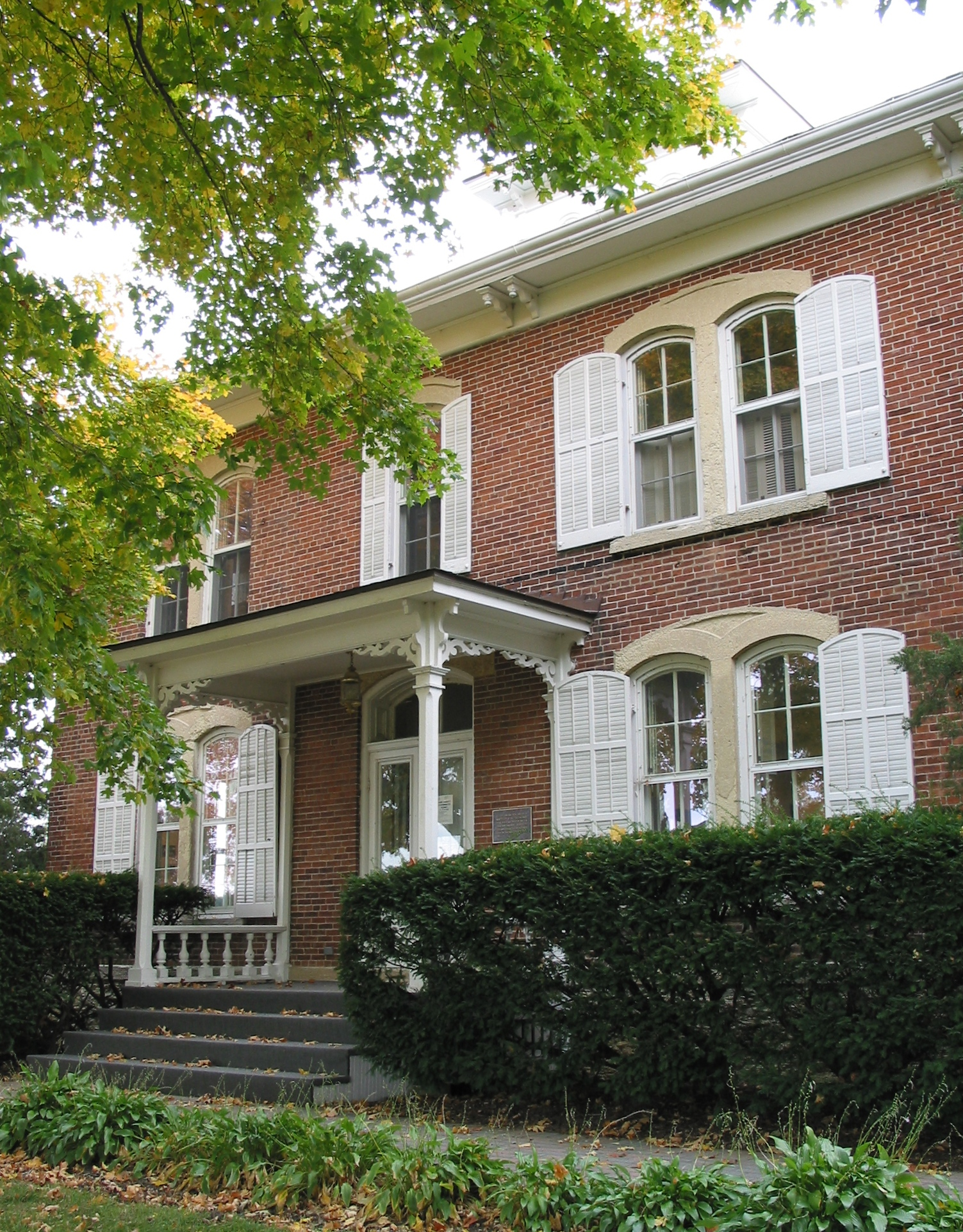
Peck House, c. 2004

A permanent, two-story residence was constructed on the Peck property in 1869. It was built in the Italianate style with a symmetrical appearance, overhanging eaves, arched lintels and central cupola. Today, the house serves as a museum, nature center, and Geneva Park District offices.
