= Westville (Georgia) =

History museum in Georgia, United States

Historic Westville Village
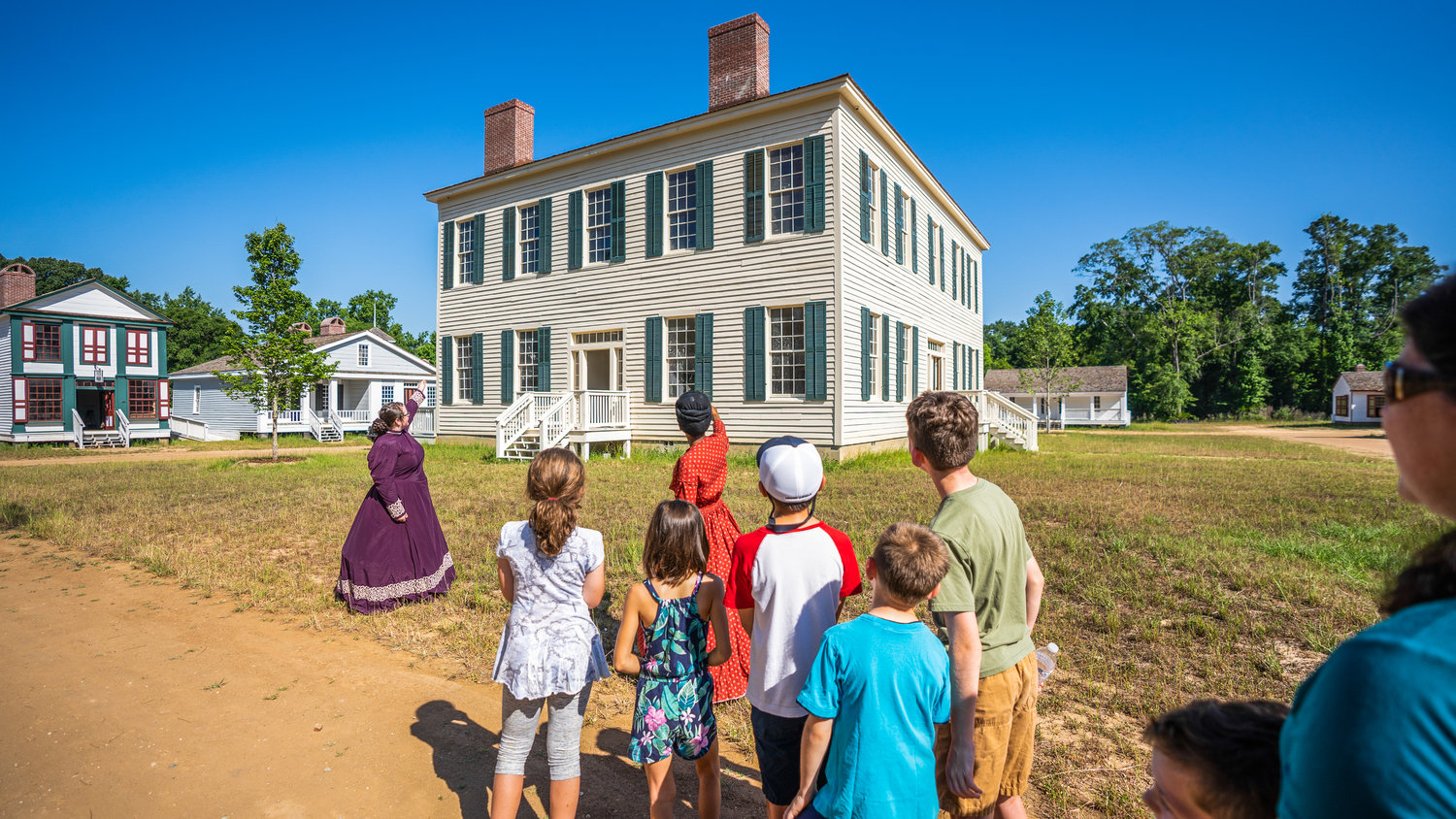
- A tour group at Historic Westville is led by two guides wearing dresses typical of the 1840s as they point to the town courthouse.
- Former name: Westville Historic Handicrafts
- Established: 1966
- Location: 3557 South Lumpkin Road, Columbus, Georgia 31903, United States
- Coordinates: 32.3818°N 84.9578°W
- Type: Living history museum
- Website: www.westville.org

Westville, also known as Historic Westville Village, is an open-air history museum that depicts a mid-19th-century Georgian town. It opened in Lumpkin, Georgia in 1970, relocated to Columbus, Georgia in 2016, and reopened to the public in 2019. The museum features historic buildings, interpreters, and demonstrations of traditional crafts representing the period from 1840 to 1870.

== Early history ==
The history of Westville is connected to Lt. Col. John Word West, a history professor at North Georgia College in Dahlonega. West was born in 1876, at a time when Georgia was undergoing significant economic and social upheaval following the American Civil War (1861–1865), including urbanization and Reconstruction in Atlanta and statewide agrarian decline. As a child, West listened to his grandparents describe ways of life that were gradually disappearing. He later drew on these experiences to create a museum intended to preserve related stories and skills.

West worked as a high school and college teacher. In 1928, he devoted his personal funds to preserving "Georgiana", including buildings, tools, furniture, and work skills associated with Georgia's early settlement. He admired the work of John D. Rockefeller, Jr., who had started Colonial Williamsburg in Virginia in 1927, and Henry Ford, who had started Greenfield Village in Dearborn, Michigan in 1928. West sought advice from both men and may have traded artifacts with Ford.

In 1928, John West opened "The Fair of 1850" on old Highway 41 in Jonesboro, Georgia, about twenty miles south of Atlanta. From 1932 to 1934, he moved the oldest buildings in his collection to the Fair's site. One of the buildings moved to Jonesboro was his grandparents' log house. He and others demonstrated traditional skills for visitors, including woodworking, cloth-making, open-hearth cooking, and shoemaking.

West attempted to transfer ownership of his project to the state but was unsuccessful. He died in 1961.

== Lumpkin site ==
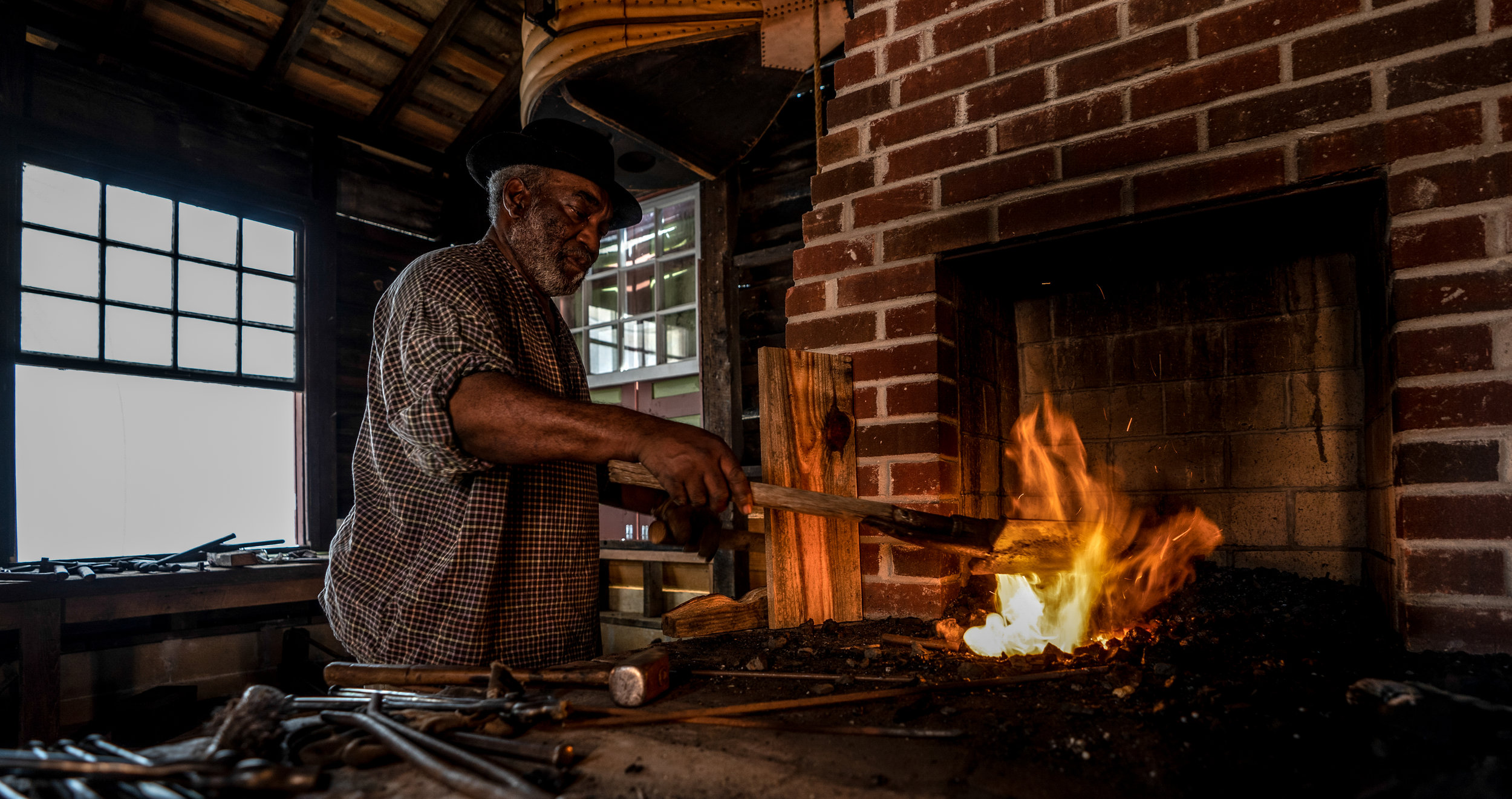
Historic Westville's Lead Blacksmith working at a forge

Five years after West's death, the citizens of Stewart County decided to develop heritage tourism as a new local industry. The county was transitioning away from its traditional agricultural economy. However, the county still had many buildings and artifacts from the pre-Civil War period.

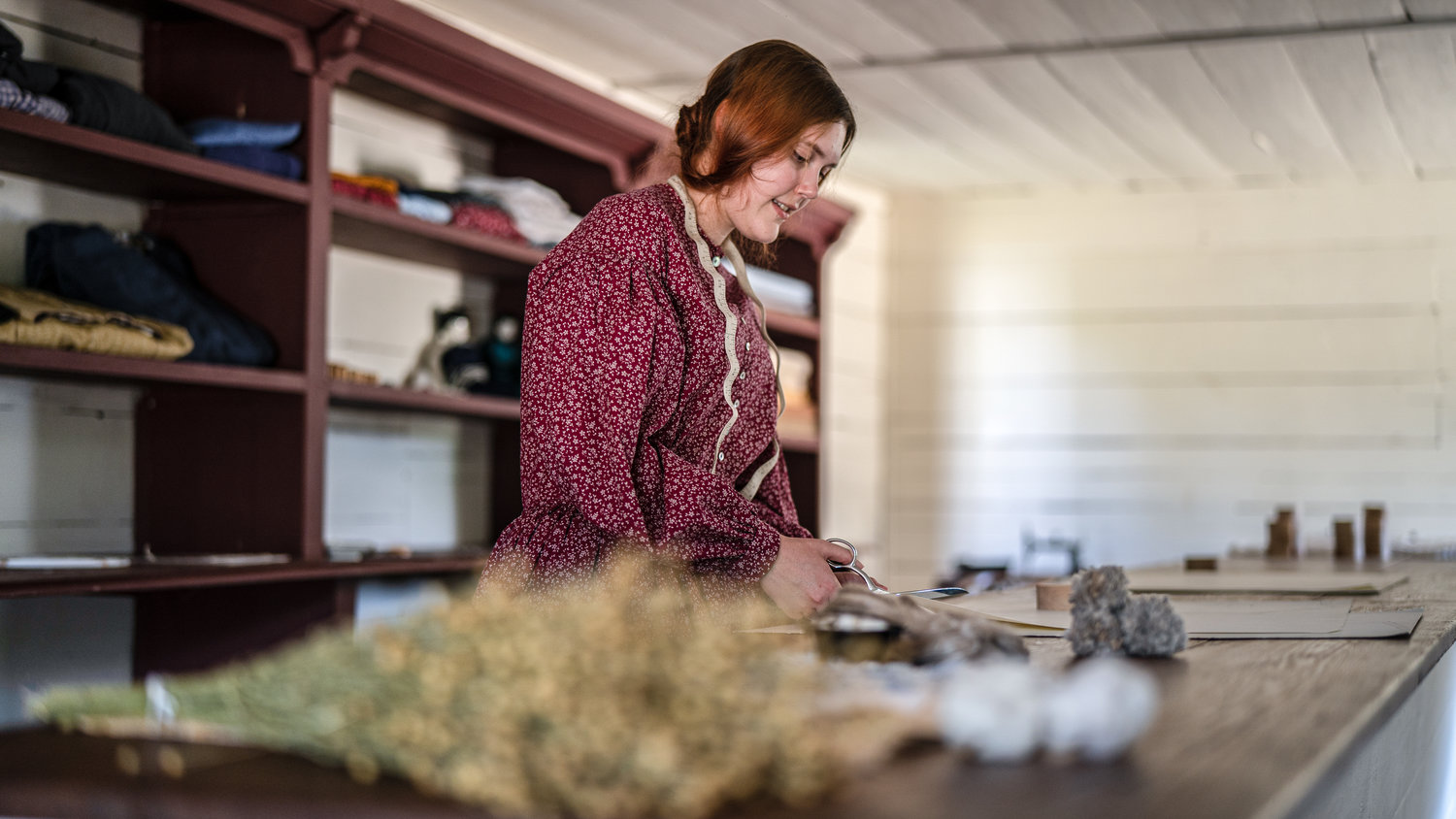
Dressmaker at Historic Westville

The preservation of the West collection was made possible in part through the efforts of Dr. Joseph Mahan, a colleague of West's. Mahan, who is reported to have visited West's Fair of 1850 as a youth, was also the curator of the Columbus Museum of Arts and Crafts (now Columbus Museum).

One evening, over dinner at the Singers' home, Mahan outlined a plan for the West Collection. He proposed creating a village where historic houses could be moved and preserved, traditional crafts and trades could be demonstrated, and local people could be employed. Subsequently, the museum received a donation of 59 acres of land on the south side of Lumpkin. This marked the establishment of Westville Historic Handicrafts in June 1966.

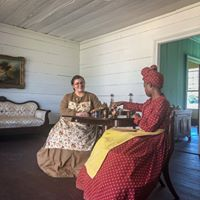
Two of Historic Westville's interpreters in the Singer House's parlor

By 1969, the new museum had purchased the West Collection and opened to the public in the spring of 1970. The six oldest buildings at the Jonesboro site were moved to Westville, along with many West artifacts. The rest of the collection has been assembled mostly by donations from individual donors. In 2001, Westville Historic Handicrafts became Historic Westville in order to expand interpretation beyond handicrafts to broader living history, including demonstrations and crafts.

Westville's executive board chairman, Tripp Blankenship, considered moving the Living History Museum to Columbus, Georgia. A protest against the plan was held on October 23, 2014. By July 2016, the Lumpkin site was closed.

== Columbus site ==
Westville reopened on June 22, 2019, in Columbus, Georgia. Plans were announced to expand interpretation and move other buildings from the Lumpkin site, subject to available funding.

As of October 2019, Westville offered live demonstrations and interpreters describing crafts. The interpreters wore clothing in the style of the 1840–1860 period and presented information about living in South Georgia and the people who lived there during the 19th century.

Westville temporarily closed in February 2024. April Kirk was later hired as a new director, and the site reopened in November 2025. The site offers group tours and other programs.

Westville employs twelve historic interpreters who demonstrate traditional trades. Leather working and boot making are shown in the Singer Boot Shop, South Georgia quilting in the Singer House, traditional carpentry in the West Wood Shop, and Blacksmithing in the Woodruff Blacksmith Shop. A dressmaker produces clothing worn by interpreters at the site. Many demonstrations use historic methods and techniques. Tools from the period are on display in the houses and are occasionally used.

== See also ==
- List of museums in Georgia (U.S. state)
