= Bristol, Wisconsin =

Bristol, Wisconsin may refer to:

- Bristol, Dane County, Wisconsin, a town in Dane County
- Bristol (town), Kenosha County, Wisconsin, a former town in Kenosha County
- Bristol (village), Wisconsin, a village in Kenosha County

== See also ==
- Bristol Renaissance Faire, a permanent Renaissance theme-park village in Kenosha County
