= Dwinell-Wright Company =

Defunct coffee roaster in Boston, Massachusetts

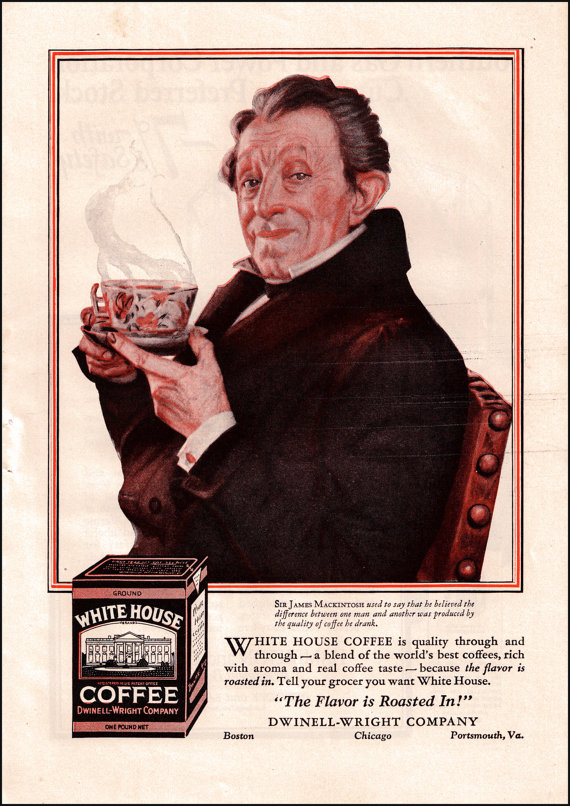
Dwinell-Wright advertisement featuring a painting of a man and a quote from Sir James Mackintosh

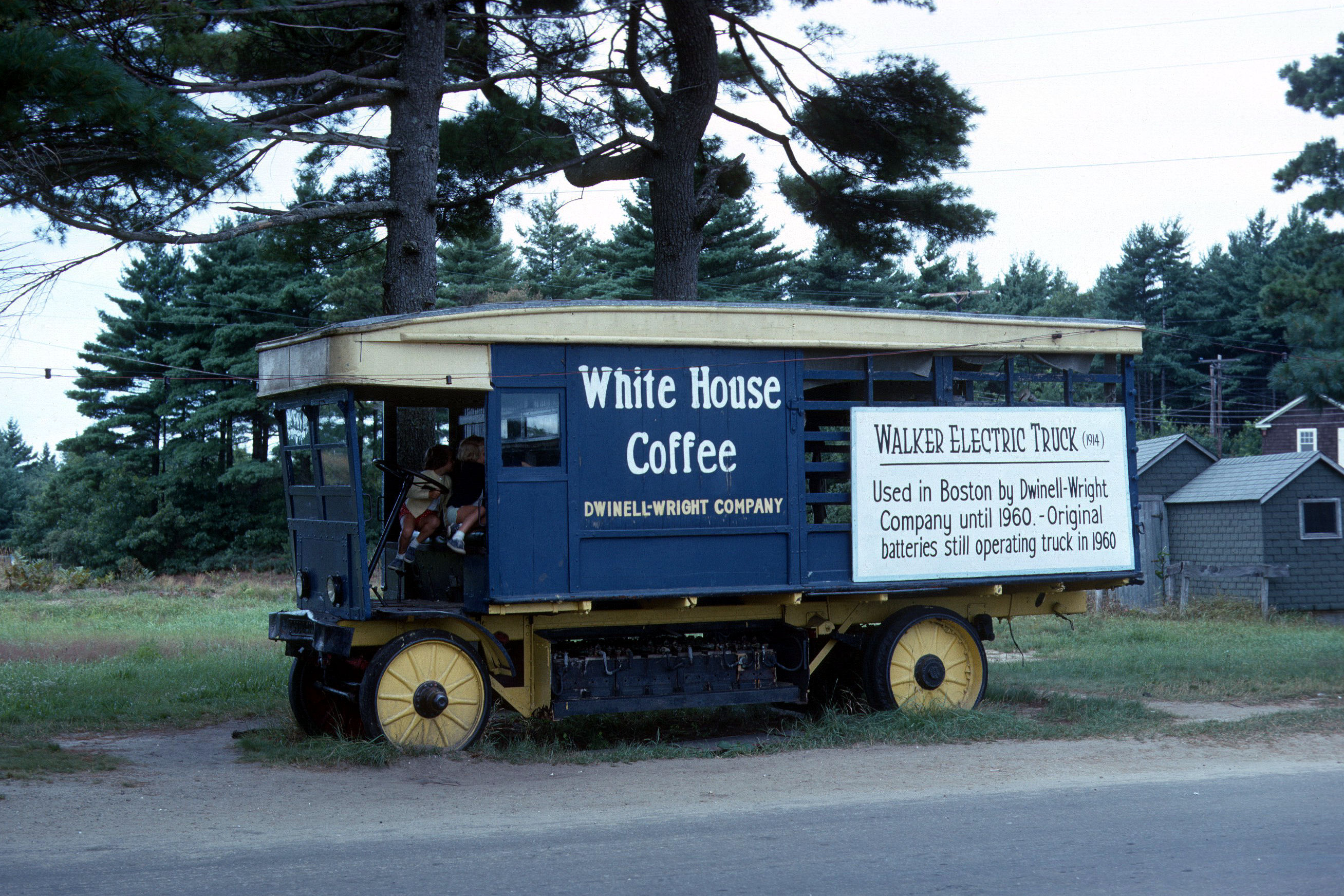
A 1914 Walker Electric Truck used by the Dwinell-Wright Coffee Co. displayed at Edaville Railroad in Carver, Massachusetts circa 1966

Dwinell-Wright Company and their White House brands of coffee and tea were the last and best known incorporation of one of the pioneers of the coffee roasting business in Boston, Massachusetts. James F. Dwinell started roasting coffee as Dwinell & Co. in 1845, and in 1879 he joined forces with Martin Hayward and George C. Wright to become Dwinell, Hayward and Co., which evolved to Dwinell-Wright Company in 1899 after the death of Mr. Hayward.

Dwinell-Wright eventually opened offices in Chicago, Illinois and Portsmouth, Virginia. The company ceased operations sometime between 1958 and 1960.

== Trademark and advertising ==
Dwinell-Wright Company marketing materials often appear on auction sites that carry memorabilia, notably retail and wholesale decorated tins as well as advertising. The most common and apparently most popular materials include the image of a dapper gentleman enjoying a steaming cup of coffee above a quote attributed to Sir James Mackintosh who "...used to say that he believed the difference between one man and another was produced by the quality of the coffee he drank."

Among their frequent slogans: "None Better at Any Price" and "The Flavor Is Roasted In!" Beginning in the 1920s much of this marketing material was produced under the direction of George Crampton, a nephew of George C. Wright.

A consequence of using "White House" as its primary brand name for coffee and tea (and orange and grapefruit juice beginning in 1941) there are frequent references to Dwinell-Wright defending their trademarks or defending their use of them. For example, in 1942 the National Fruit Products Company challenged Dwinell-Wright's use of the "White House" brand even though Dwinell-Wright began using the trademark in 1888 vs. 1907 for National Fruit who refrained from challenging the use for 33 years afterward.

== Logistics ==
The company employed the use of a 1914 Walker Electric Truck in Boston, primarily to haul coffee beans from off-loading ships on the waterfront to their warehouse, until 1960.
