= Fresh Meadow Pond =

Lake in Massachusetts, United States

- Location within Massachusetts
- Location: Carver and Plymouth, Massachusetts
- Coordinates: 41°55′05″N 70°44′36″W
- Basin countries: United States
- Surface area: 59 acres (24 ha)
- Islands: one unnamed island
- Settlements: East Carver

Fresh Meadow Pond is a 59-acre (240,000 m^{2}) pond in the East Carver section of Carver and Plymouth, Massachusetts, United States. An unnamed 6-acre (24,000 m^{2}) island lies in the middle of the pond. Pinewood Lodge Campground occupies, in the Plymouth portion, both the northeastern portion of the pond and the island.
