= Walker Electric Truck =

20th century U.S. electric truck company

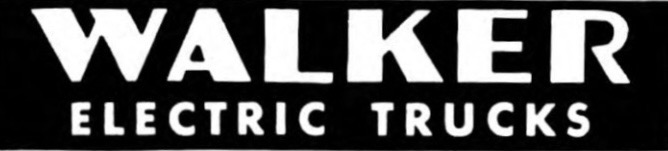
- Industry: Automotive
- Founded: 1907; 119 years ago
- Defunct: 1942; 84 years ago
- Headquarters: Chicago
- Products: trucks

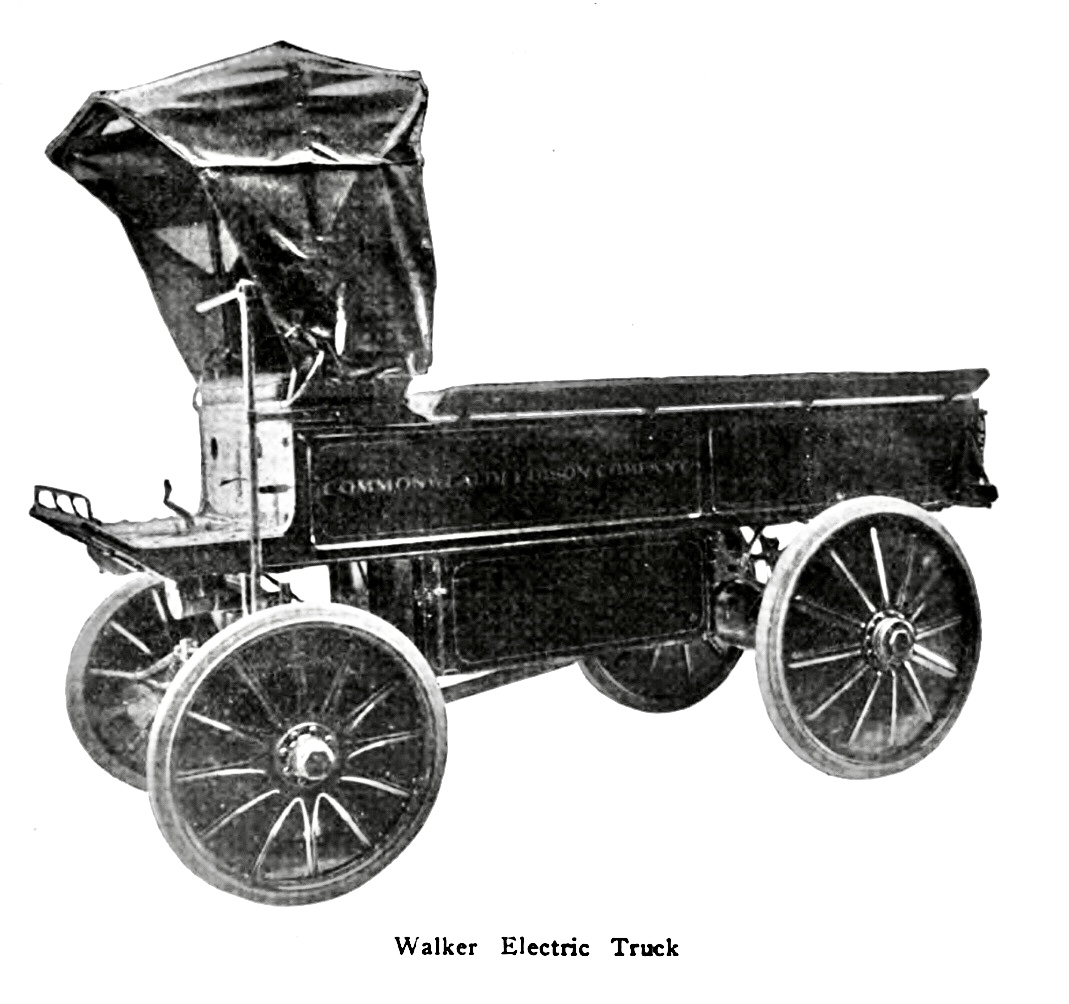
Walker Truck (1908).

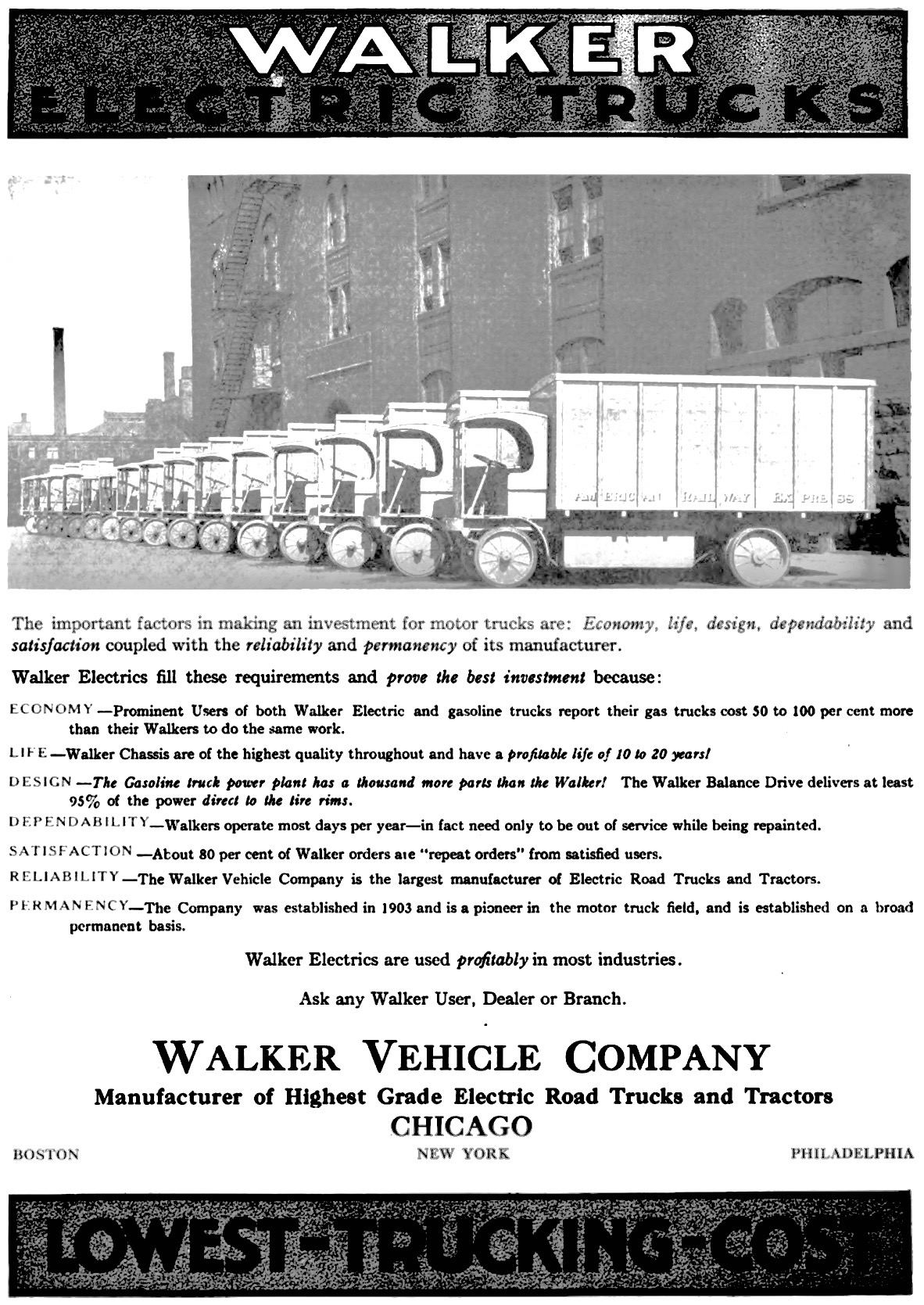
Walker advertisement (1919)

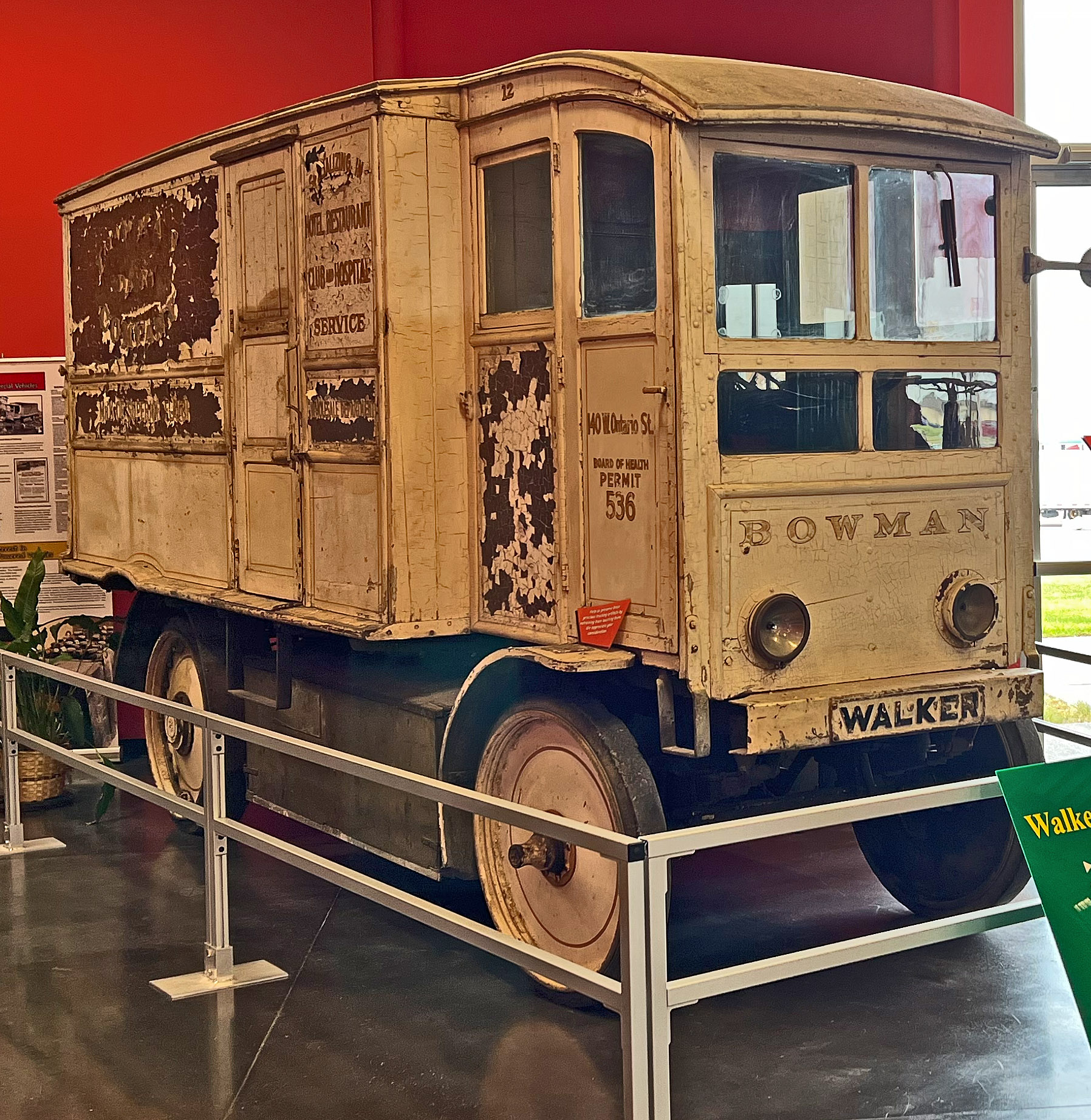
1911 Walker Electric truck on display at the Iowa 80 Trucking Museum, Walcott, Iowa.

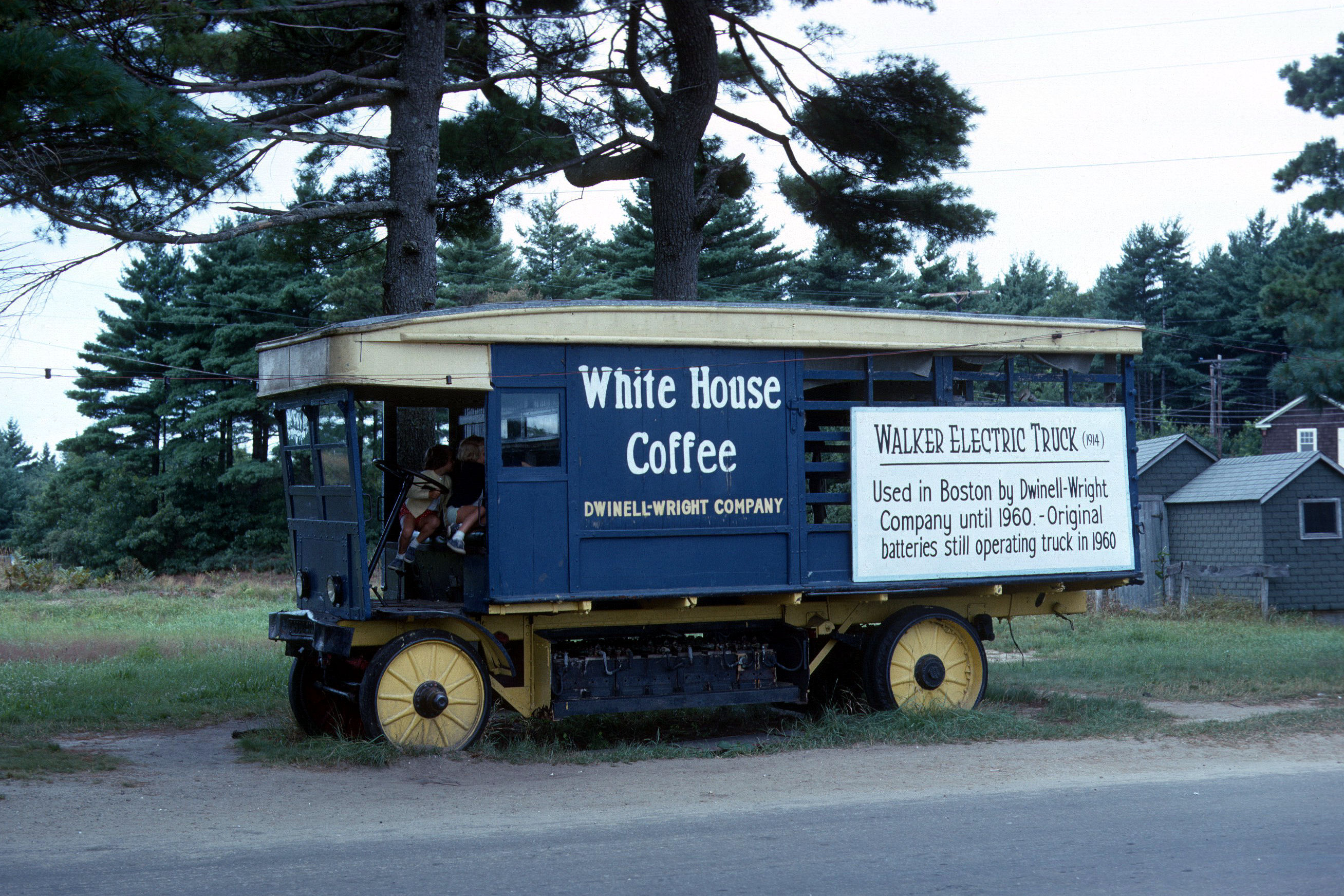
A 1914 Walker Electric Truck used by the Dwinell-Wright Coffee Co. displayed at Edaville Railroad in Carver, Massachusetts circa 1966

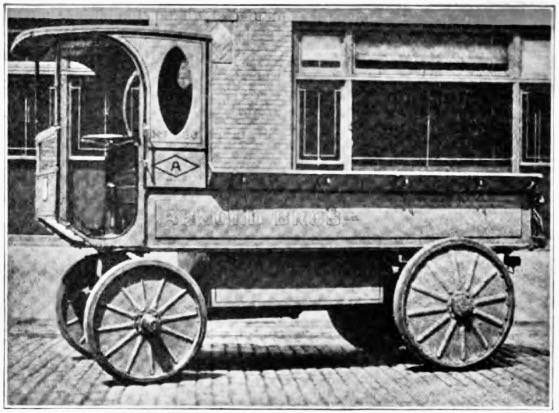
Walker Electric Truck (1916)

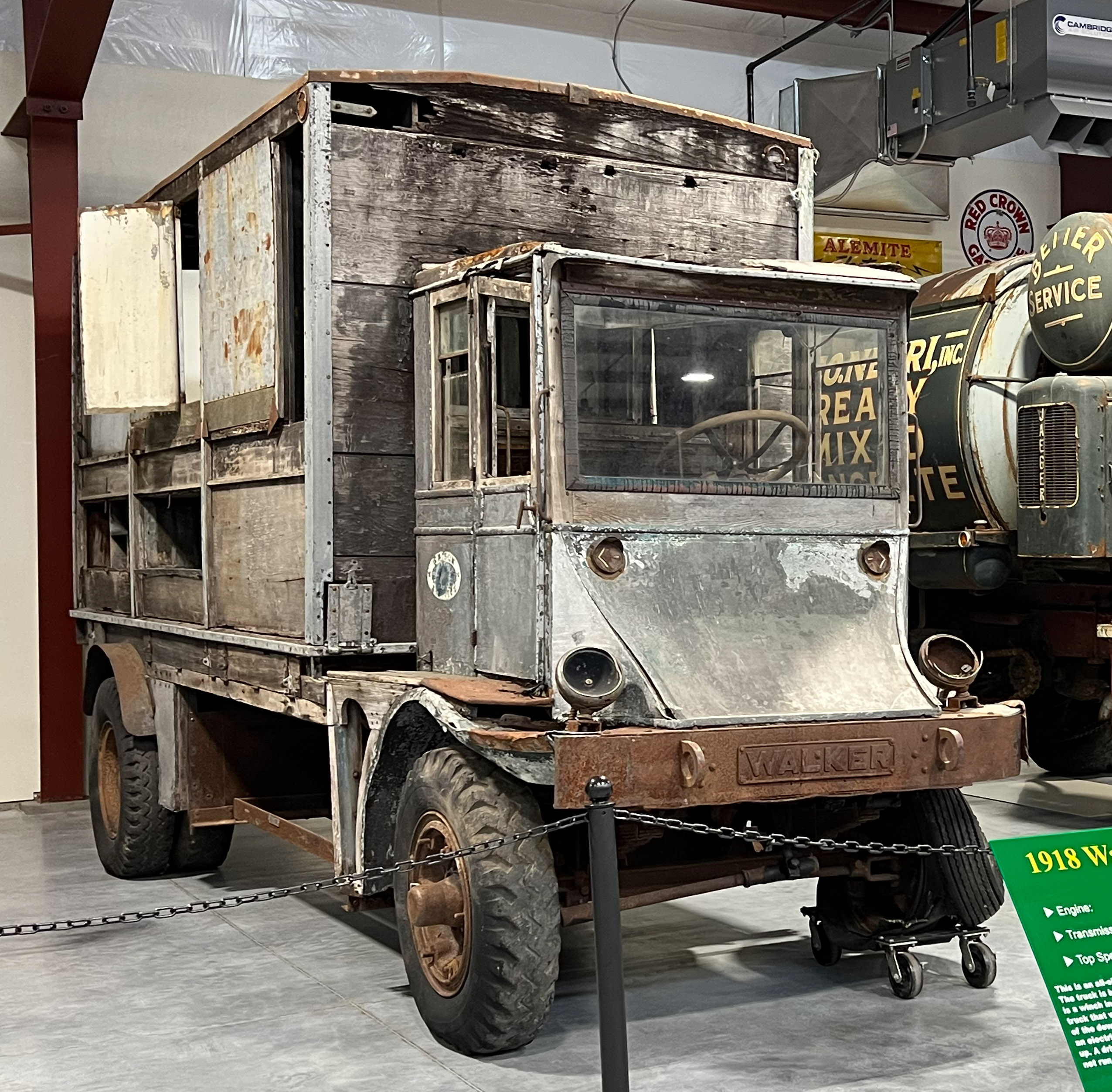
1918 Walker Electric truck on display at the Iowa 80 Trucking Museum, Walcott, Iowa.

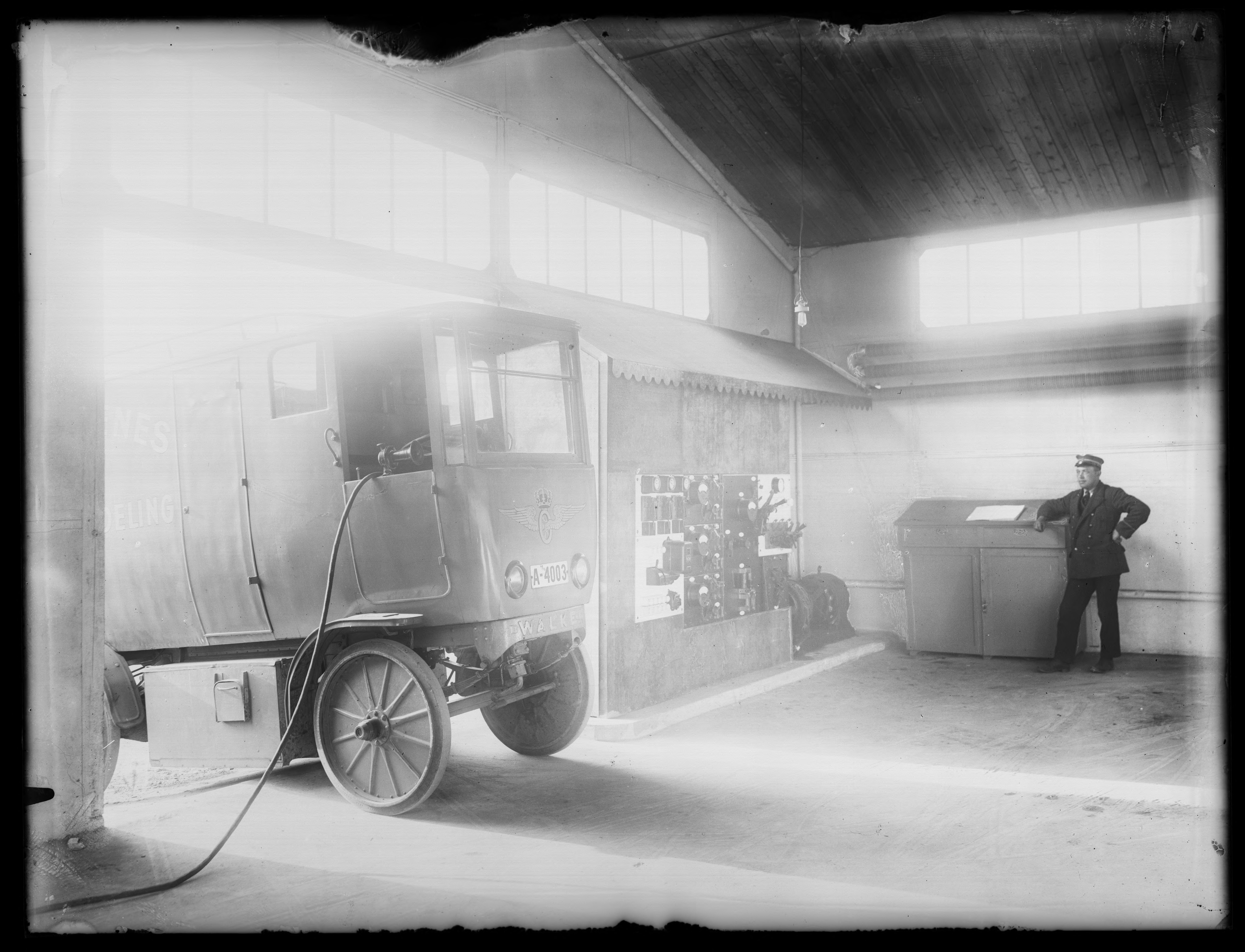
Walker Electric Truck used by Norwegian State Railways charging

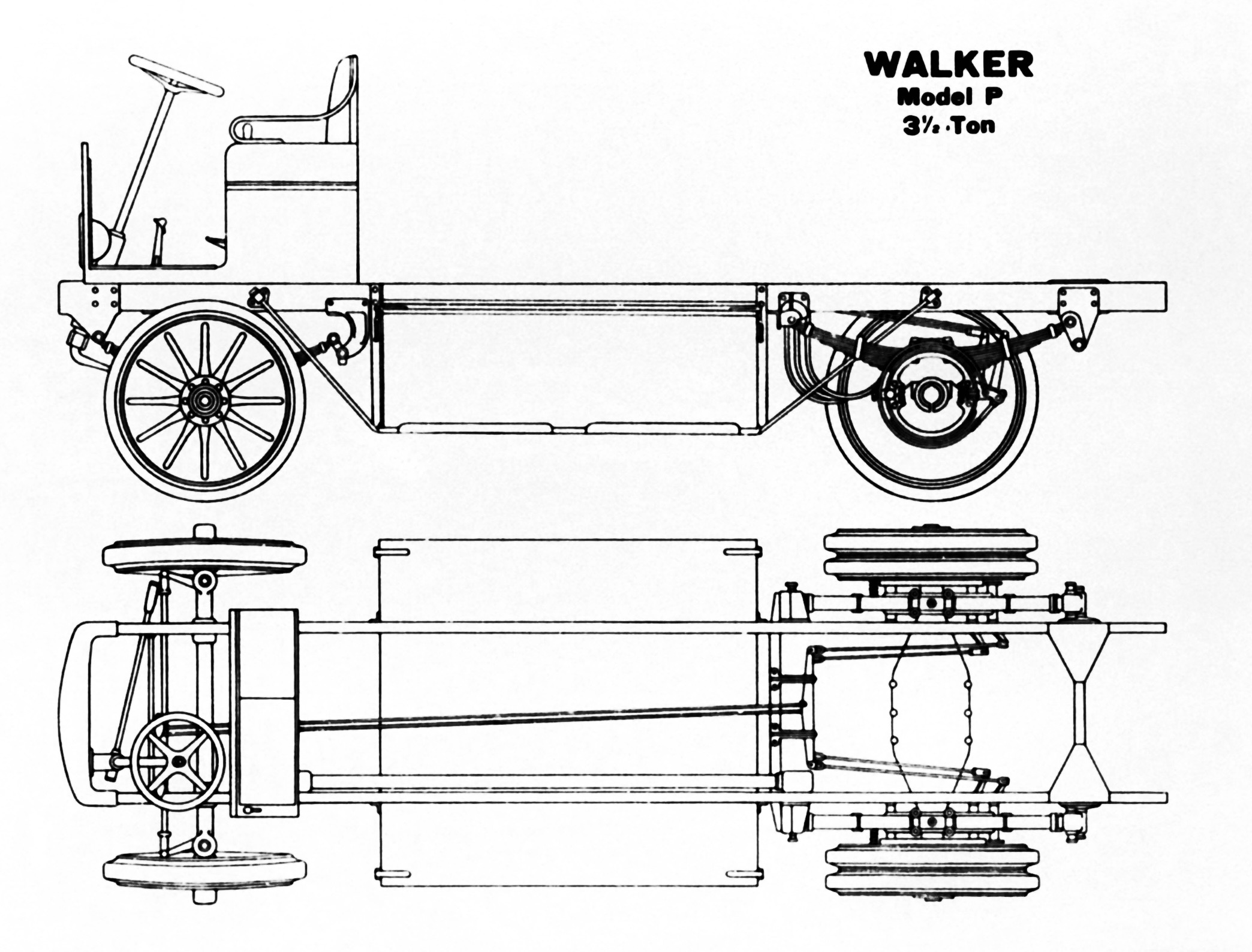
Walker Model P (1919) 3,5 to

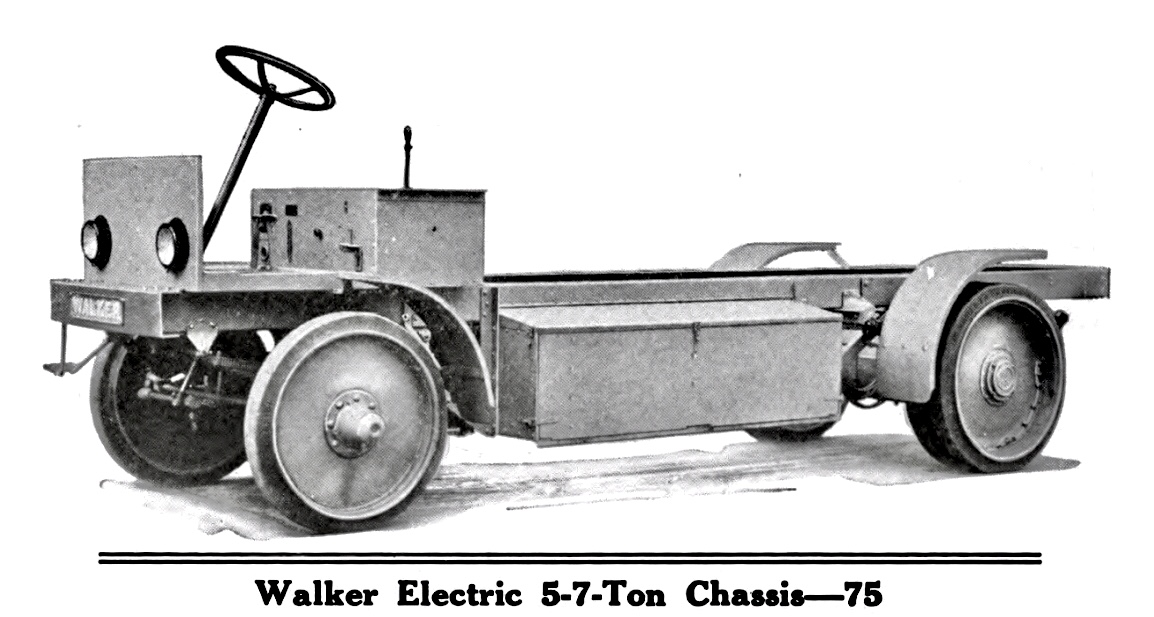
Walker 75 (1928)

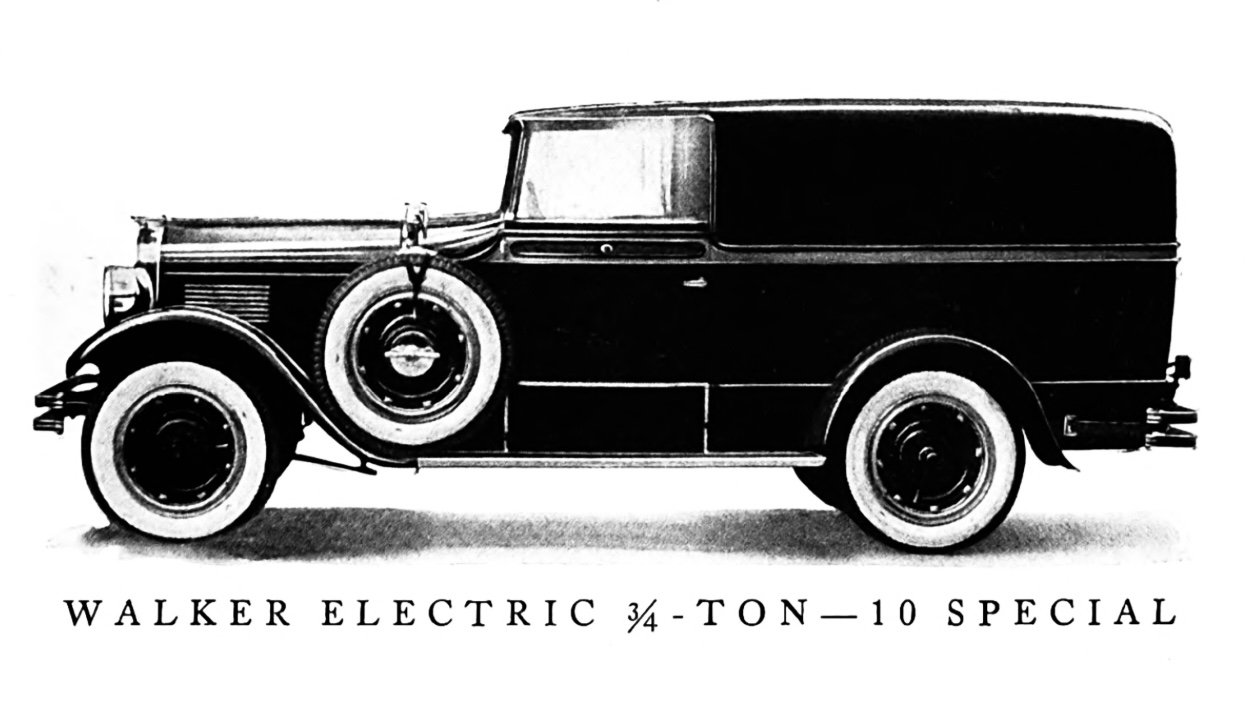
Walker 10 Special (1929)

Walker Electric Trucks were battery-powered vehicles built from 1907 to 1942 in Chicago, Illinois and Detroit, Michigan. According to the advertisement from 1919 the company was established in 1903. Initially designed and manufactured by the Walker Vehicle Company (not to be confused with the Walker Motor Car Company) in Chicago, they were bought by the Anderson Electric Car Company of Detroit in 1916, then sold to Commonwealth Edison of Chicago in 1920, and last to York & Towne in 1933. In addition to trucks, the company manufactured the Chicago Electric Car. Several of their trucks were long in service, surviving the brand, in some cases, by decades. A few of them are now on display in museums or, in the case of one exported to New Zealand, still "in service" with its original owner Orion New Zealand Limited.

According to Jay Christ's Collection of Antique Delivery Trucks and Classic Cars in Manchester, Pennsylvania, that has restored two Walker Electric Trucks—a 1919 Model LA-10, and a 1938 Model 500 Gas-Electric Dynamotive:

Walker manufactured many different models of trucks and these trucks were sold all across the USA and even to Britain and New Zealand. These trucks had a 3.5 HP electric motor that was powered by many batteries to produce 66 to 80 volts and a maximum of 40 amps. The driving range of these trucks was about 50 miles and the maximum speed was 10 to 12 MPH. The trucks were plugged into a charging station in the evening after the daily deliveries were completed...These trucks were a welcome relief for the general public and the delivery companies. Previously the deliveries were made by horse and wagon. The horses were not the most sanitary because of their daily habits of relieving themselves anywhere they felt like it along the routes. This didn't make the customers too happy. The horses were loyal in the task of pulling the wagons but their pace was slow compared the trucks. The first companies to use this style of delivery were dairies, bakeries, US Mail, retail store and freight companies. Marshall Field and Company had a fleet of 276 electric Walker Trucks in 1925.

The Iowa Trucking Museum in Walcott, Iowa has a 1911 Walker Electric Truck that had been owned and used by Bowman Dairy and celebrated the truck's 100th birthday at the Walcott Truckers Jamboree in 2011. A 1918 Walker Electric panel van is displayed at the Thor Electric Truck company in Los Angeles.

The Dwinell-Wright Company in Boston, Massachusetts employed a Walker Electric Truck from 1914 through 1960 to move freight—primarily green coffee beans—from the docks to their South Boston warehouse. Afterward, the vehicle was put on display at Edaville Railroad.

== Production figures Walker trucks ==
The pre-assigned serial numbers only indicate the maximum possible production quantity.

Year	Production figures	Model	Load capacity	Serial number
1916		M	0,45 to	
		K	0,9 to	
		L	1,8 to	
		D	2,7 to	
		E	3,6 to	
		N	4,5 to	
1919		P	3,5 to	
1928		10	0,75 to	
		20	to	
		25	to	
		45	to	
		50	to	
		65	to	
		75	5-7 to	
