= Bates Pond (Carver, Massachusetts) =

Lake in United States of America

- Location within Massachusetts Location within the United States
- Location: Carver, Massachusetts
- Coordinates: 41°50′10″N 70°46′22″W
- Basin countries: United States
- Surface area: 20 acres (8.1 ha)
- Settlements: Huckleberry Corner

Bates Pond is a 20-acre (81,000 m^{2}) pond in Carver, Massachusetts. The pond is located south of Edaville Railroad. Huckleberry Corner lies along the southern shore of the pond. The water quality is impaired due to non-native plants in the pond.
