= Fuller Street Pond =

Pond in Plymouth County, Massachusetts

- Location within Massachusetts
- Location: Carver and Middleborough, Massachusetts
- Coordinates: 41°54′25″N 70°48′47″W
- Type: reclaimed mine pit
- Basin countries: United States
- Max. length: 1,165 feet (355 m)
- Max. width: 680 feet (210 m)
- Surface area: 21 acres (8.5 ha)

Fuller Street Pond is a 21-acre (85,000 m^{2}) pond in Carver and Middleborough, Massachusetts. The pond gets its name from the name of the street along the pond's northern shore on the Carver side. The street name on the Middleborough side is Stone Street. The water quality is impaired due to non-native aquatic plants and non-native fish.
