= King Richard's Faire =

Renaissance Faire held in Carver, Massachusetts

Coordinates: 41.864526°N 70.762784°W

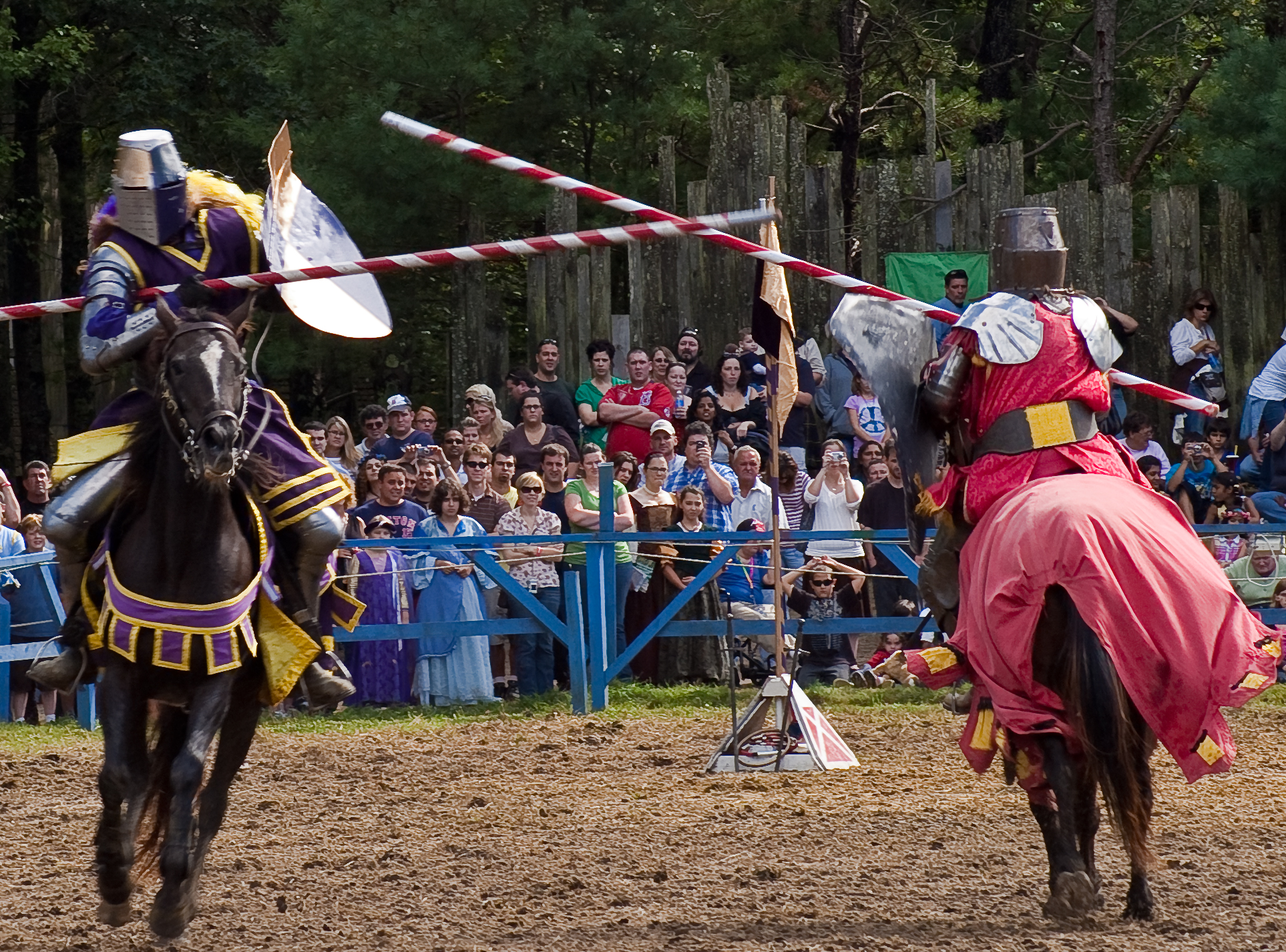
- Jousters at King Richard's Faire, 2009
- Genre: Renaissance Faire
- Dates: September and October
- Locations: Carver, Massachusetts
- Inaugurated: 1982
- Area: 80 acres (320,000 m^{2})
- Stages: 10
- Website: kingrichardsfaire.net

King Richard's Faire is a Renaissance Faire held in Carver, Massachusetts, which recreates a 16th-century marketplace, including handmade crafts, foods, musicians, singers, dancers, minstrels, mimes, jugglers, whip artists, magicians, comedians, puppeteers, acrobats, animal acts, mud beggars, stilt walkers, knights jousting on horseback, a royal court, and the fictional King Richard. King Richard's Faire is the largest and longest-running Renaissance Faire in New England.

== History ==
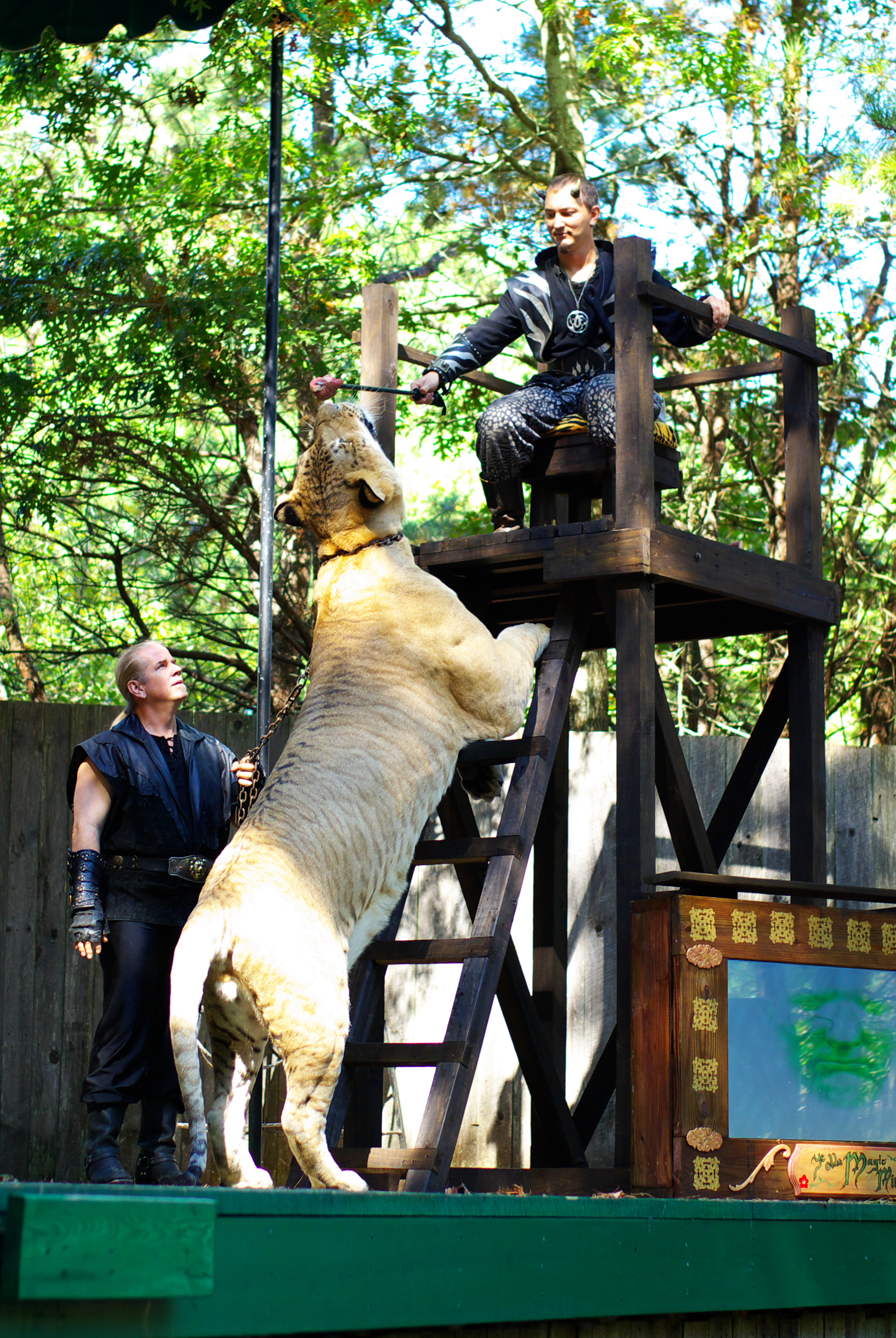
A liger shown at the Faire, 2007

The Faire was founded in 1982 by the late Richard Shapiro and his wife Bonnie, who ran the original "King Richard's Faire" in Bristol, Wisconsin (which was renamed Bristol Renaissance Faire when the Shapiros sold it to Renaissance Entertainment Corporation in 1988). Today, Bonnie and her daughter Aimée Shapiro Sedley produce the show. King Richard's Faire is the largest and longest-running Renaissance Faire in New England. There was no faire in 2020 due to the COVID-19 pandemic. The 39th faire was deferred to 2021.

The 40th anniversary season ran weekends and Monday holidays from September 4th through October 24th, 2021.

Performers have included social media personality and Guinness World Record holder Jack Lepiarz (who set his first world record at the Faire).

Two costumed fairgoers at King Richard's Faire's Edaville Railroad location, 2026

In March of 2025, it was announced by new owners Lancelot Entertainment Boston, LLC that King Richard's Faire will relocate to the nearby Edaville Railroad.

== Details ==
King Richard's Faire is operated on 80 acres (32 ha) of pine forest and has 8 stages plus a tournament field for live jousting. The buildings are permanent year-round structures. King Richard's Faire runs for eight consecutive weekends from the first weekend in September through the third weekend in October (including Labor Day and Columbus Day), closing for bad weather.

== See also ==
- List of Renaissance fairs
- Historical reenactment
- Society for Creative Anachronism
- List of open air and living history museums in the United States
