= Ron Scot Fry =

Ron Scot Fry is the former entertainment and artistic director of the Bristol Renaissance Faire. He is also a college professor, a writer, director, artist and performer. He has two children.

== Work history ==
Fry was the Artistic Director of the Bristol Renaissance Faire, from 1989 to 2009, Virginia Renaissance Faire, Renaissance Pleasure Faire in 2006 and 2007. While there, he wrote and directed dozens of staged works, designed several buildings including the charming Tuscany Tavern, two-story Public House and Cheshire Chase Action Stage. His accomplishments included design and construction of full scale dragon puppet, 10 foot tall jester puppet, among others. Fry was a teacher, designer, technician, and SAFD certified Fight Cast director and performer.

As Artistic director, Fry was a key player in the success of the Bristol Renaissance Faire. His approach to street theatre helped to make the Bristol Faire an interactive Renaissance Faire. In 1989, Fry started BAPA, the Bristol Academy for the Performing Arts, where young performers learned how to speak Olde English, fight with swords, interact with guests and develop improvisational skills. Fry brought in teachers from Chicago's Second City and The Players Workshop. He oversaw most of the acts at the Bristol Faire and directed all of the faire's scenario shows, much of the street theatre, and all new performers coming into BAPA.

Fry founded the Bristol Academy for the Performing Arts (BAPA), which held classes in movement, character development, street, commedia dell'arte, and improvisation.

In 2009, Fry helped transform the non-profit he founded in 1993 into Optimist Theatre and became the Founding Artistic Director for Shakespeare in the Park in Milwaukee, WI. An Equity company, producing full length, free outdoor productions.
