= Jack the Whipper =

American circus performer (born 1988)

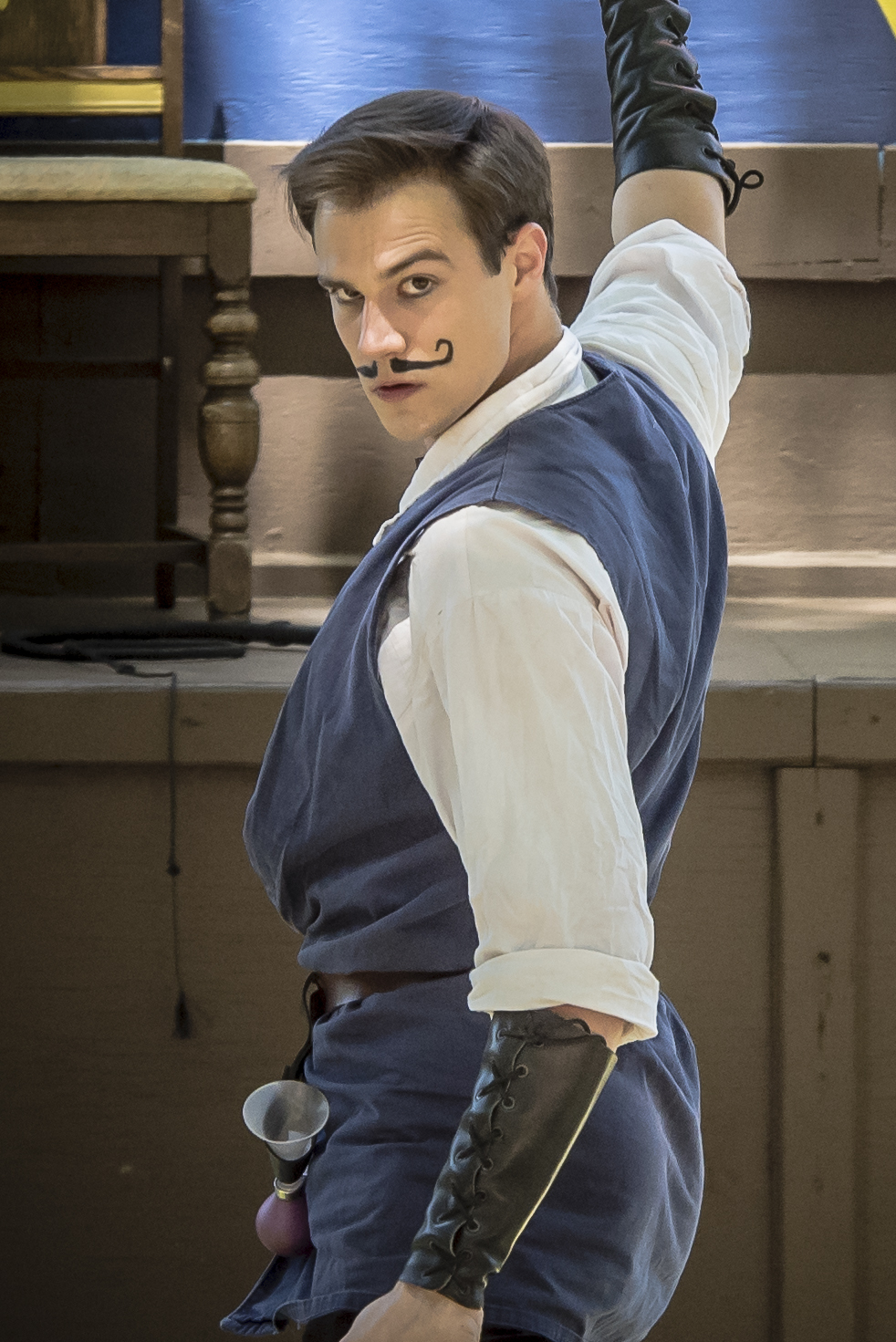
- Jack the Whipper in 2015
- Born: John Andrew Lepiarz; 1988 (age 37–38); Waco, Texas, U.S.
- Other name: Jacques Ze Whipper (persona)
- Education: Emerson College, BA
- Occupation: Circus performer
- Website: www.jackthewhipper.com

John Andrew "Jack" Lepiarz (born 1988), better known by his stage names Jack the Whipper and Jacques Ze Whipper, is an American circus performer and social media personality. He is best known for his whip cracking stage show which he performs at several Renaissance festivals and posts on social media, where he has 4 million followers.

From 2010 to 2023, he was also a radio anchor and producer at WBUR in Boston, Massachusetts.

== Early life and education ==
Lepiarz was born in Waco, Texas, to John Lepiarz, a circus clown and variety performer, and Linda Van Blerkom, an anthropology professor at Drew University. He grew up in Madison, New Jersey, attending Madison High School, from which he graduated in 2006. As a child, he would join his father traveling with the Big Apple Circus. His father would perform with bullwhips and throwing knives, and started teaching Jack around the age of 7. He received a bullwhip for Christmas when he was 17.

Lepiarz described feeling ostracized by his school peers for his circus background: “Growing up in normal school, being the son of a circus parent, I was not the most popular person. They never let me forget that I was from the circus. In 2013, I suddenly noticed that a lot of people were getting into the circus arts. I was like, ‘Where was this six years ago?!’” He graduated in 2010 with a bachelor's degree in journalism from Emerson College. While attending Emerson, he was the news director at WERS Emerson College Radio, "basically living there" for two years. Lepiarz earned money as a street performer in Faneuil Hall and Harvard Square, using the personas "Jacques Ze Whipper" (sometimes alternately spelled "Whippeur" to emphasize the exaggerated French accent) and "Jack the Whipper" (both a reference to Jack the Ripper).

== Radio journalism ==
After graduating college, Lepiarz worked as a radio anchor and producer at NPR radio station WBUR, in Boston, Massachusetts, having interned first as a senior.

== Stage performance and world records ==
Throughout the year, Jack performs at multiple Renaissance fairs throughout the United States, as his persona "Jacques Ze Whipper." He was introduced to whipcracking by his father, who was also a regular performer when Jack was a child. In 2015, after spending 8 weeks training, he appeared to set the Guinness World Record for "most whip cracks with one hand in 60 seconds," with 260, beating the previous record by 3. Upon review, it was discovered he fell a few counts short. He has since set new records of 278 and 289 (both in 2016) and 298 (in 2020).

== Television and social media ==
Jack joined TikTok when a clip of him brandishing a flaming whip at King Richard's Faire went viral on the social media platform. In 2022, the video also caught the attention of producers for America's Got Talent, and Jack auditioned for the television show. After being dismissed by talent judge Simon Cowell before he could perform, he invited Cowell on stage and had Cowell hold a strand of dry spaghetti with his legs, then split the spaghetti with a bullwhip. Lepiarz had planned to perform the trick with Howie Mandel, who turned out to be ill. The show's producers had encouraged Jack to use a different trick, which he practiced all day, until host Terry Crews improvised and suggested on air that Jack perform the original trick with Cowell. He had never performed the trick in front of an audience prior, and admitted feeling "nervous."

As of August 2026, Jack has over 4 million TikTok followers, and over 144 million "likes" on the platform.

== Other work ==
In 2023, Lepiarz participated in a study at Northeastern University, focused on the "extremes of human motor control." He wore a motion capture suit and used an "almost 5.5-foot long bullwhip and covered it in reflective motion capture markers."

== Personal life ==
Lepiarz's wife is a photographer and videographer who also helps him with social media work.

Lepiarz is also an avid amateur baseball player, having played in the Boston MSBL Age 28+ division since 2018. In 2020, while playing for the Boston Dodgers, he won the Triple Crown by leading the league in batting average (.515), home runs (5), and runs batted in (15).

On October 26th, 2026, Leiparz announced via his social media accounts that he and his wife are expecting their first child, which would cause him to limit his 2027 performing schedule.
