= Vaughn Pond (Massachusetts) =

Pond in Carver, Massachusetts

- Location within Massachusetts Location within the United States
- Location: Carver, Massachusetts
- Coordinates: 41°53′27″N 70°46′47″W
- Basin countries: United States
- Surface area: 22 acres (8.9 ha)
- Settlements: Carver

Vaughn Pond is a 22-acre (89,000 m^{2}) pond in Carver, Massachusetts near the center of the town.
