= Bristol Renaissance Faire =

Renaissance fair in Bristol, Kenosha County, Wisconsin

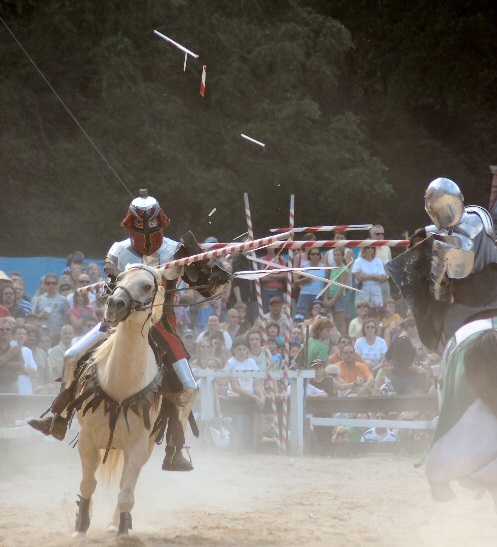
- Jousting at the Bristol Renaissance Faire, 2006
- Genre: Renaissance fair
- Dates: July–September
- Locations: Bristol, Kenosha County, Wisconsin, United States
- Coordinates: 42°29′55″N 87°57′22″W
- Inaugurated: 1973
- Attendance: 198,000–400,000 (average)
- Stages: 16
- Website: renfair.com/bristol/

The Bristol Renaissance Faire is a Renaissance fair held in a Renaissance-themed park in the village of Bristol in Kenosha County, Wisconsin. Its 30-acre site runs along the Wisconsin-Illinois state line west of Interstate 94. It recreates the visit of Queen Elizabeth I to the English port city of Bristol in 1574. The faire runs for nine weekends from early July through Labor Day.

== History ==
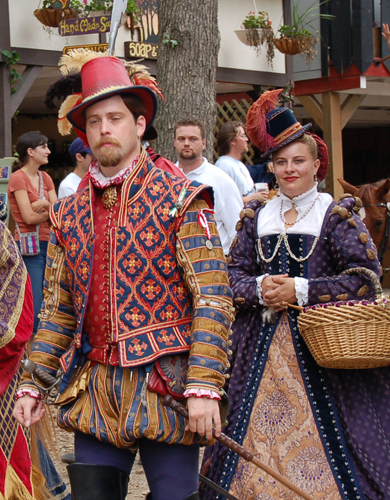
Costumed performers from the 2006 Bristol Renaissance Faire

Bristol Renaissance Faire jousting video

The Bristol Renaissance Faire was founded in 1972 by Richard Shapiro and his wife Bonnie as "King Richard's Faire". The event was a four-weekend fair and drew approximately 10,000 people.

In 1988, the Shapiros sold the fair to Renaissance Entertainment Corporation, having created a second incarnation of the King Richard's Faire in Carver, Massachusetts. The original King Richard's Faire was re-opened that year as the "Bristol Renaissance Faire". The reigning monarch became Queen Elizabeth I rather than the fictional "King Richard", and the year was set at 1574. At that time, the fair played seven weekends and drew over 200,000 visitors annually, thus placing it among the highest attended in the world. Renaissance faire staples such as jousting tournaments, historical reenactments, and stage shows continue.

For the first time in its history, the faire's 2020 season was cancelled due to the COVID-19 pandemic.

== Production values ==
The Bristol Faire's proximity to Chicago and Milwaukee enabled the artistic directors to bring improv comedy teachers from The Second City and The Players Workshop, including instructor and director Eric Forsberg, who taught improvised interactive street theater techniques until 1997, and Ron Scot Fry, who was artistic director from 1989 until 2008.

The Mud Show, Dirk & Guido: The Swordsmen, and Moonie the Magnificent have won awards from the Annual Renaissance Festival Awards.

== Critical commentary ==
Journalist Neil Steinberg said of the Bristol Renaissance Faire: "If theme parks, with their pasteboard main streets, reek of a bland, safe, homogenized, whitebread America, the Renaissance Faire is at the other end of the social spectrum, with a whiff of the occult, a flash of danger, and a hint of the erotic. Here, they let you throw axes. Here are more beer and bosoms than you'll find in all of Disney World."

== See also ==
- List of Renaissance fairs
- List of open air and living history museums in the United States
