= Annasnappet Pond Site =

The Annasnappet Pond Site was excavated, beginning in 1978 by the Public Archaeology Lab, when the Massachusetts Highway Department began the process of relocating Route 44 through Plympton, Plymouth, Carver and Kingston. Because the department was using federal funds, it was required to do an archaeological survey of the area, which revealed potential for sites at Annasnappet Pond in Carver, Massachusetts.

== Historical background ==
The site was in use for 100 years as a cranberry bog, after it was deeded to James Webb in 1886. A significant portion of archaeological evidence at the site was destroyed or disrupted by sand removal from the bog.

== Archaeological research ==
Archaeologists dug test pits every 15 feet and found artifacts in piles made by bulldozers. Evidence suggests the site was occupied between 10,000 and 1,000 years ago and had extensive chipping debris—up to 100,000 stone flakes—along with 1600 stone tools. The tools included arrowheads, spear points, atl-atl weights, fragments of soapstone bowls, red paint stones and grinding tools. The majority of artifacts dated to the Middle Archaic, between 8,000 and 6,000 years ago and the site yielded the most Archaic artifacts in the Northeastern US. Annasnappet Pond also had 100 stained soil areas and rock clusters, preserving the remains of trash pits, hearths and storage pits. Charcoal from the pits was radiocarbon dated to 7500 years ago.

A small knoll at the southern end of the pond contained a human burial—the oldest found in Massachusetts. Charcoal around the burial suggests an age of 7,570 years ago. The site lacked Woodland period ceramics.

The site lacked post molds, from remnant structures, due to acidic and well-drained soil, which decomposed any remains of wood.
