= Bristol (village), Wisconsin =

Bristol, Wisconsin
- Village
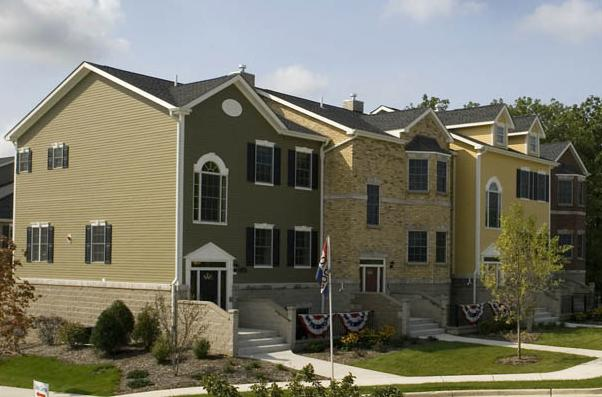
- Motto: "Naturally"
- Location of Bristol in Kenosha County, Wisconsin
- Coordinates: 42°33′32″N 88°02′57″W
- Country: United States
- State: Wisconsin
- County: Kenosha
- Incorporated: December 1, 2009

Government
  - Type: Village board

Area
  - Total: 33.06 sq mi (85.63 km^{2})
  - Land: 32.70 sq mi (84.70 km^{2})
  - Water: 0.36 sq mi (0.93 km^{2})
- Elevation: 778 ft (237 m)

Population (2020)
  - Total: 5,192
  - Density: 157.2/sq mi (60.71/km^{2})
- Time zone: UTC-6 (Central (CST))
  - Summer (DST): UTC-5 (CDT)
- ZIP Code: 53104
- Area code: 262
- FIPS code: 55-09800
- GNIS feature ID: 1562217
- Website: Official website

Bristol is a village in Kenosha County, Wisconsin, United States. It was incorporated in 2009 from portions of the Town of Bristol. The population was 5,192 at the 2020 census, more than double the 2010 census population of 2,584. The former unincorporated communities of Bissell, Cypress, Pikeville, and Woodworth are located in the village.

== History ==
The Bristol area's first settler was Rollin Tuttle, who arrived in April 1830. The village was named in 1836 for two brothers, George and Lester Bristol.

The first Barnum circus to play in Wisconsin played in Bristol before the Civil War.

In November 2009, residents of the Town of Bristol living in the 9 square miles (23 km^{2}) of the northwestern corner of the town voted to incorporate as a village. The incorporation became official on December 1, 2009, when a certificate of incorporation was issued by the Secretary of State of Wisconsin. The first elections for village officials took place on January 19, 2010.

In early January 2010, village officials approved filing a petition with the county court to hold a referendum on annexing the remainder of the Town of Bristol. On June 29, 2010, the village of Bristol voted to annex the remainder of the town of Bristol. The annexation took effect on July 4, 2010. A small section of the town was also annexed by the village of Pleasant Prairie.

== Geography ==
According to the United States Census Bureau, the village has a total area of 9.03 square miles (23.39 km^{2}), of which 8.91 square miles (23.08 km^{2}) is land and 0.12 square miles (0.31 km^{2}) is water.

Bristol has several residential neighborhoods:

=== Bissell ===
Bissell is located at the intersection of Kenosha County Highways C (Wilmot Road) and MB, just south of the residential neighborhood of Woodworth. A feed, flour, and coal business was a part of community life in 19th-century Bissell, especially after a U.S. post office was established within that building in 1893; however, the post office closed 16 months later.

=== Cypress ===
Cypress is a neighborhood flanking U.S. Highway 45 at 128th Street (Kenosha County Highway WG), just north of the Wisconsin-Illinois border. At the time it was settled, the village was named Hoadley, and had its own post office under that name.

=== Pikeville ===
Pikeville is a residential and agricultural community (originally named Pikeville Corners) named for three brothers surnamed Pike. It was settled around the one-room Pikeville School in the 19th century, however the school building is currently used as a restaurant: The Red School Cafe. It is centered along U.S. Route 45 at 116th Street (Kenosha County Highway V), approximately one mile north of the Wisconsin-Illinois border, on the eastern shore of Mud Lake.

=== Woodworth ===
Woodworth is located on Kenosha County Highway MB at 82nd Street. The Kenosha and Rockford Railroad (the "KD Line") brought prosperity and activity to Woodworth, and a U.S. post office (ZIP Code 53194) is located there. By 1920, a large serum laboratory had been built in Woodworth. It provided wartime vaccines for troops and civilians. Woodworth's rural appearance has been featured in at least one on-location television commercial, as well as in the 1999 movie, The Last Great Ride, starring Ernest Borgnine and Eileen Brennan.

== Demographics ==
Historical population
Census	Pop.	Note	%±
2010	2,584		—
2020	5,192		100.9%
U.S. Decennial Census

=== 2020 ===
Bristol village, Wisconsin – Racial and ethnic composition Note: the US Census treats Hispanic/Latino as an ethnic category. This table excludes Latinos from the racial categories and assigns them to a separate category. Hispanics/Latinos may be of any race.
Race / Ethnicity (NH = Non-Hispanic)	Pop 2010	Pop 2020	% 2010	% 2020
White alone (NH)	2,382	4,612	92.18%	88.83%
Black or African American alone (NH)	31	28	1.20%	0.54%
Native American or Alaska Native alone (NH)	4	10	0.15%	0.19%
Asian alone (NH)	13	51	0.50%	0.98%
Native Hawaiian or Pacific Islander alone (NH)	0	0	0.00%	0.00%
Other race alone (NH)	3	18	0.12%	0.35%
Mixed race or Multiracial (NH)	33	212	1.28%	4.08%
Hispanic or Latino (any race)	118	261	4.57%	5.03%
Total	2,584	5,192	100.00%	100.00%

=== 2010 census ===
As of the census of 2010, there were 2,584 people, 934 households, and 716 families residing in the village. The population density was 290.0 inhabitants per square mile (112.0/km^{2}). There were 1,006 housing units at an average density of 112.9 per square mile (43.6/km^{2}). The racial makeup of the village was 94.9% White, 1.2% African American, 0.2% Native American, 0.5% Asian, 1.4% from other races, and 1.7% from two or more races. Hispanic or Latino of any race were 4.6% of the population.

There were 934 households, of which 39.2% had children under the age of 18 living with them, 61.6% were married couples living together, 11.5% had a female householder with no husband present, 3.6% had a male householder with no wife present, and 23.3% were non-families. 17.6% of all households were made up of individuals, and 5.1% had someone living alone who was 65 years of age or older. The average household size was 2.77 and the average family size was 3.15.

The median age in the village was 39 years. 26.5% of residents were under the age of 18; 8.8% were between the ages of 18 and 24; 23.8% were from 25 to 44; 32.2% were from 45 to 64; and 8.7% were 65 years of age or older. The gender makeup of the village was 49.6% male and 50.4% female.

== Economy ==
Bristol has a commercial/industrial/small business incubator park and is home to the Bristol Renaissance Faire theme park, as well as the Pringle Nature Center.
