= Bristol (town), Kenosha County, Wisconsin =

Bristol, Wisconsin
- Former Town
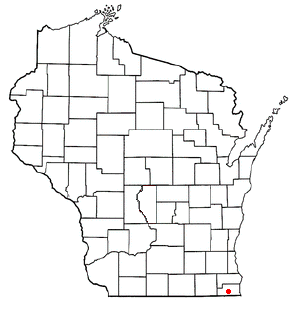
- Location of Bristol, Wisconsin
- Coordinates: 42°32′35″N 88°0′58″W
- Country: United States
- State: Wisconsin
- County: Kenosha

Area –(n/a due to de-annexations)
  - Total: 35.1 sq mi (90.8 km^{2})
  - Land: 34.7 sq mi (89.9 km^{2})
  - Water: 0.35 sq mi (0.9 km^{2})
- Elevation: 696 ft (212 m)

Population (2000)
  - Total: 4,538
  - Density: 131/sq mi (50.5/km^{2})
- Time zone: UTC-6 (Central (CST))
  - Summer (DST): UTC-5 (CDT)
- FIPS code: 55-09825
- GNIS feature ID: 1582863

The Town of Bristol was a former town in Kenosha County, Wisconsin, United States. The population was 4,538 at the 2000 census—before a portion of the town was incorporated as the Village of Bristol. The remainder of the Town of Bristol was annexed by the Villages of Bristol and Pleasant Prairie effective July 4, 2010, and the town ceased to exist.

== History ==
The Bristol area's first settler was Rollin Tuttle, who arrived in April 1830; Levi Grant arrived the following month.

=== Border dispute ===
The Town of Bristol was involved in annexation disputes with Pleasant Prairie during the 1990s. The two entities reached a boundary agreement in 1997; as a result, the Circuit Court of Kenosha County dismissed motions by Pleasant Prairie to annex portions of the town.

=== Dis-establishment ===
In 1968, a state court denied the Town of Bristol's earlier petition to incorporate itself as a village.

On January 19, 2009, a state court rejected an attempt by the western half of Bristol to incorporate, which had been filed in 2008. A second attempt to incorporate a smaller section of the northwest corner of the town (filed in March 2009) was approved by the court on September 17, 2009 and was enacted with the incorporation of the Village of Bristol that year.

On June 29, 2010, in a special election, most of the remainder of the town of Bristol was annexed to the village of Bristol (effective July 4, 2010), while a small section of the town was annexed to the village of Pleasant Prairie. The town of Bristol ceased to exist.

== Geography ==
According to the United States Census Bureau, in 2000 the town had a total area of 35.0 square miles (90.8 km^{2}), of which, 34.7 square miles (89.9 km^{2}) of it was land and 0.3 square miles (0.9 km^{2}) of it (0.97%) was water. Bristol has a variety of neighborhoods, including country estates, lake homes, subdivisions, condominiums, row homes, and working agricultural areas.

In 2009, the Village of Bristol incorporated, removing approximately 9 square miles (23 km^{2}) from the towns acreage.

== Demographics ==
As of the census of 2000, there were 4,538 people, 1,715 households, and 1,260 families residing in the town. The population is growing quite a bit. The population density was 130.8 inhabitants per square mile (50.5/km^{2}). There were 1,818 housing units at an average density of 52.4 per square mile (20.2/km^{2}). The racial makeup of the town was 97.44% White, 0.29% African American, 0.11% Native American, 0.90% Asian, 0.09% Pacific Islander, 0.66% from other races, and 0.51% from two or more races. Hispanic or Latino of any race were 2.38% of the population.

There were 1,715 households, out of which 33.6% had children under the age of 18 living with them, 62.7% were married couples living together, 7.6% had a female householder with no husband present, and 26.5% were non-families. 22.3% of all households were made up of individuals, and 9.9% had someone living alone who was 65 years of age or older. The average household size was 2.65 and the average family size was 3.10.

In the town the population was spread out, with 25.9% under the age of 18, 7.1% from 18 to 24, 29.3% from 25 to 44, 25.3% from 45 to 64, and 12.5% who were 65 years of age or older. The median age was 39 years. For every 100 females there were 96.9 males. For every 100 females age 18 and over, there were 93.0 males.

The median income for a household in the town was $54,661, and the median income for a family was $63,018. Males had a median income of $44,073 versus $28,932 for females. The per capita income for the town was $24,454. About 1.6% of families and 2.2% of the population were below the poverty line, including 2.4% of those under age 18 and 1.3% of those age 65 or over.
