= Edaville Railroad =

Heritage railroad and amusement park

Coordinates: 41°50′45.4″N 70°46′22.0″W

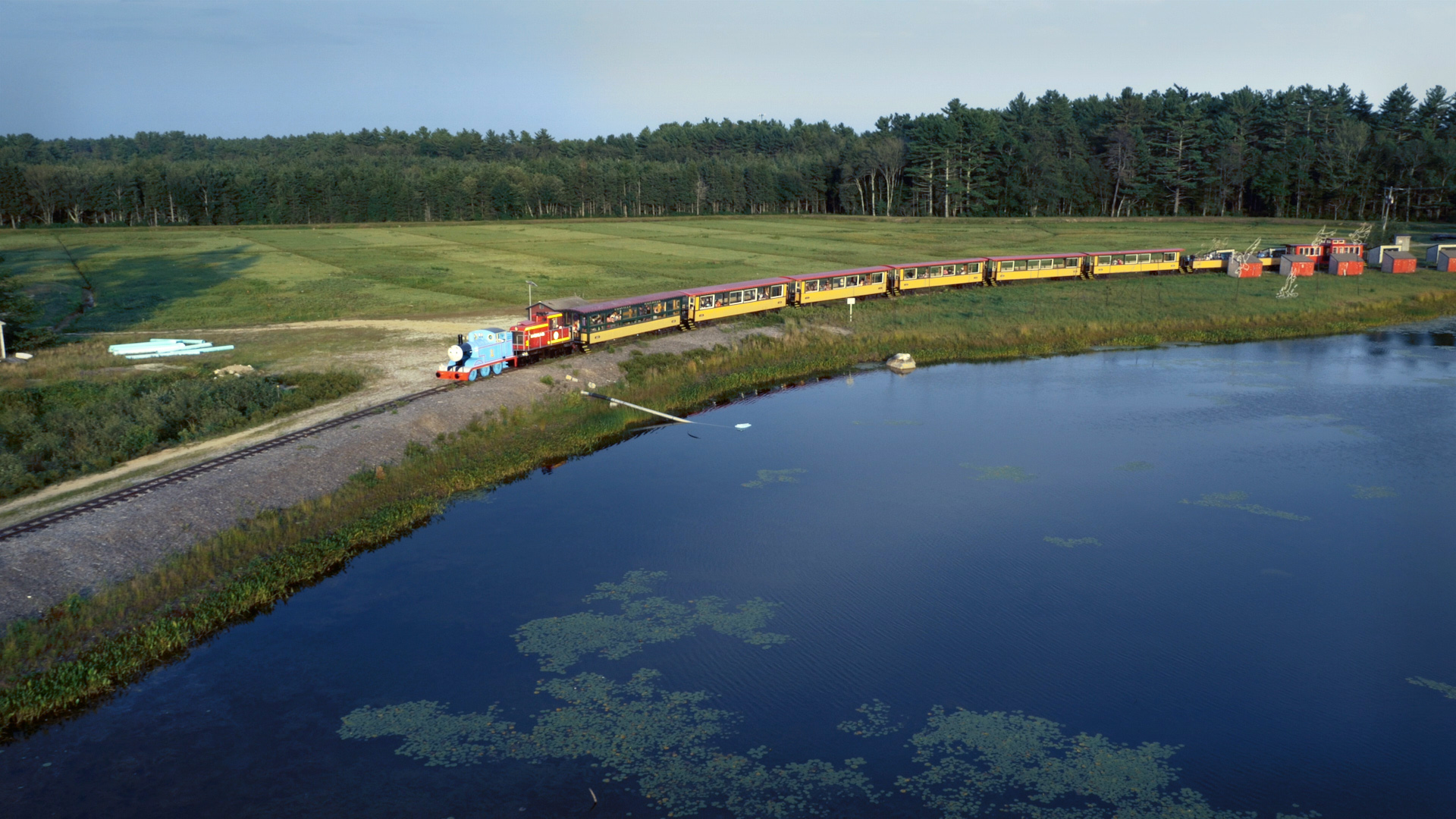
- Aerial view of Edaville's former Thomas-lead train passing through cranberry bogs in the spring of 2016. The unpowered Thomas engine was replaced with coal-fired steam engines beginning in 2022.

Overview
- Headquarters: South Carver
- Locale: Carver, Massachusetts, U.S.
- Dates of operation: 1947–1991; 1999–2024; 2025–present

Technical
- Track gauge: 2 ft (610 mm)
- Length: 2.5 miles (4.0 km)

Other
- Website: www.edaville.com

Edaville Railroad (also branded Edaville USA and Edaville Festival of Lights) is a heritage railroad and seasonal attraction in South Carver, Massachusetts. Originally opened in 1947, it was one of the oldest heritage railroad operations in the United States. It is a 2 ft (610 mm) narrow gauge line that operates excursion trains for tourists, built by the late Ellis D. Atwood (initials E.D.A., for which Edaville is named) on his sprawling cranberry farm in Southeastern Massachusetts.

== History ==
=== Conception and opening ===
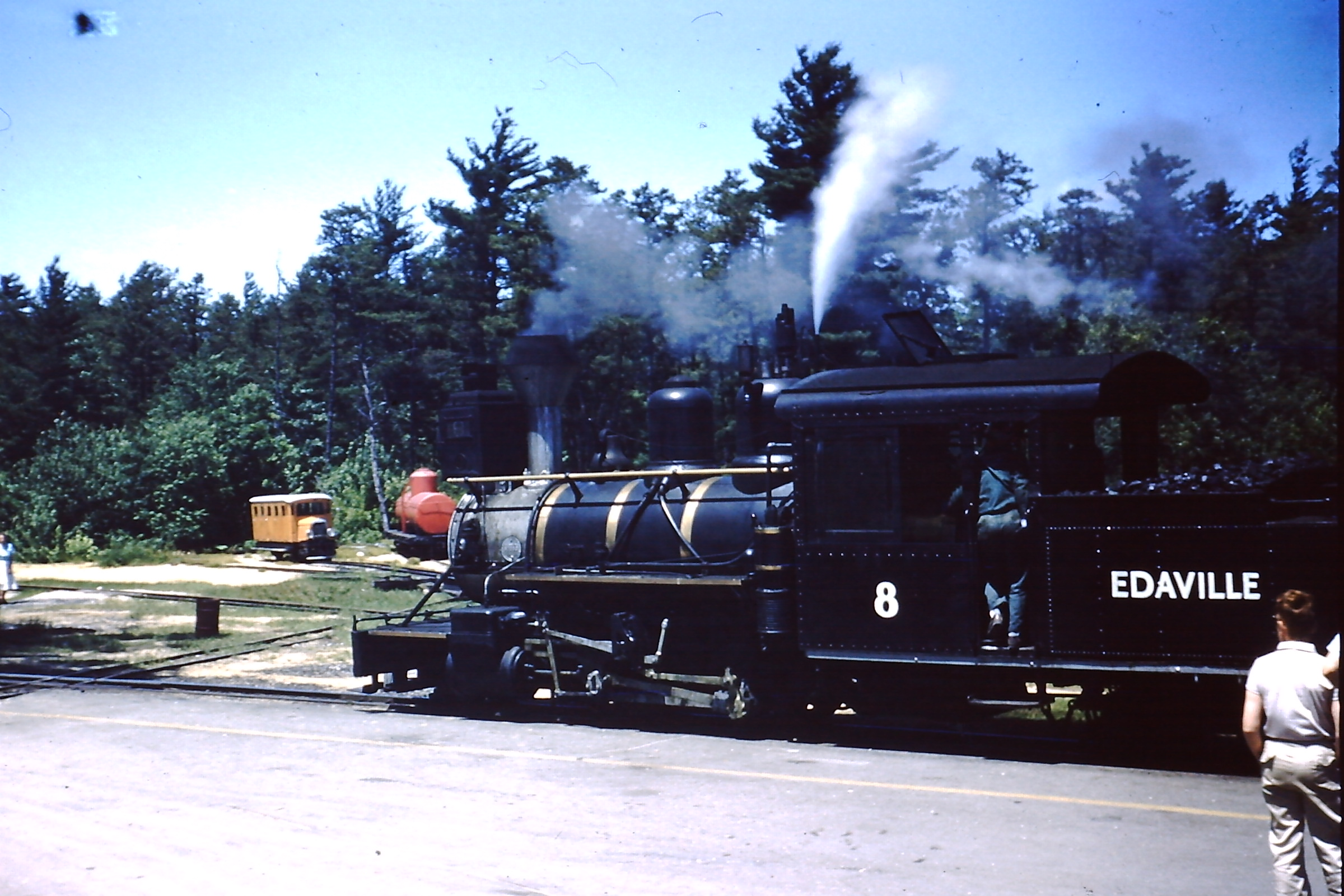
Former Bridgton locomotive operating at Edaville in 1959. A former Sandy River railbus and Bridgton tank car may be seen in the background in front of the locomotive.

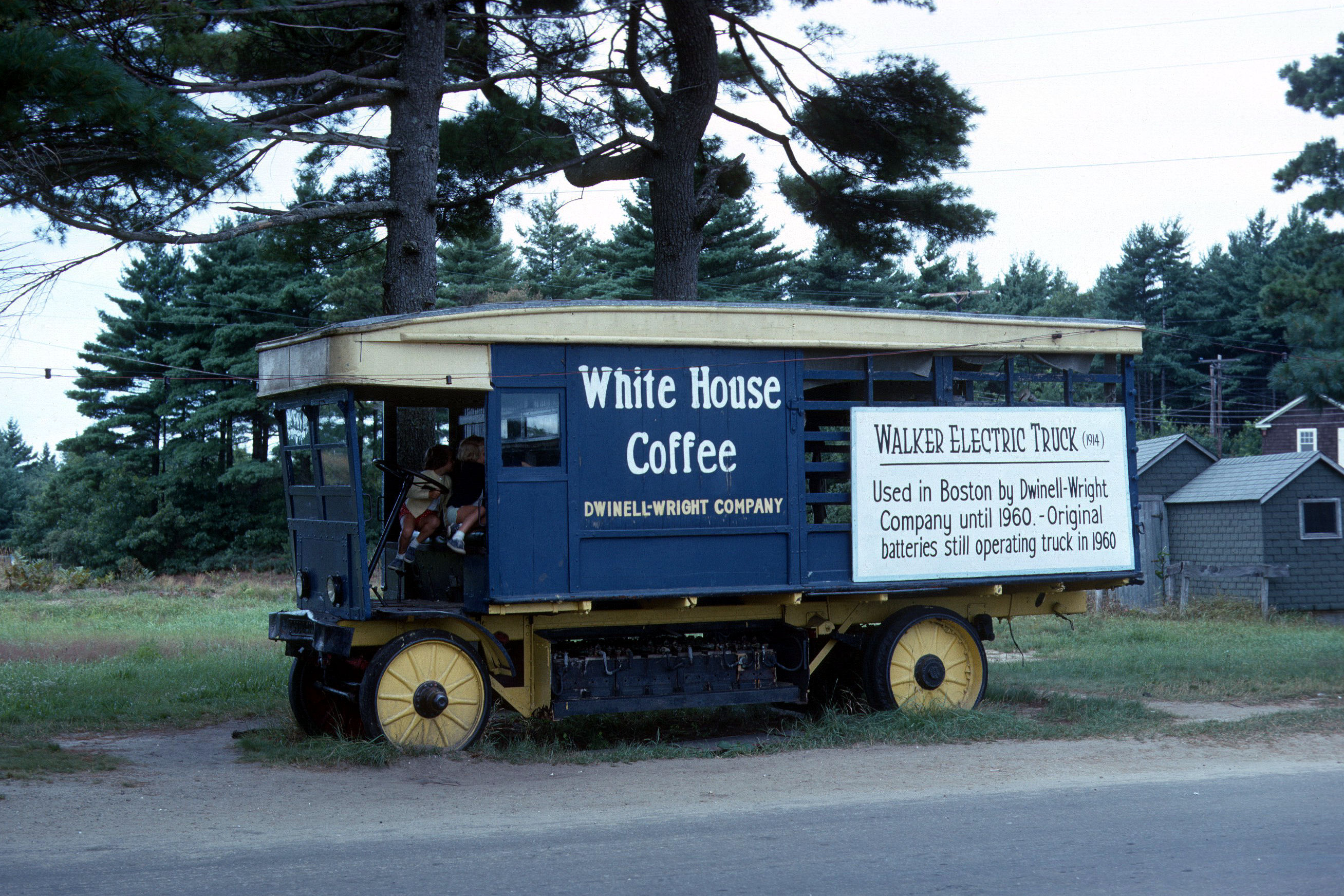
A 1914 Walker Electric Truck displayed at Edaville Railroad in South Carver, MA, USA circa 1966

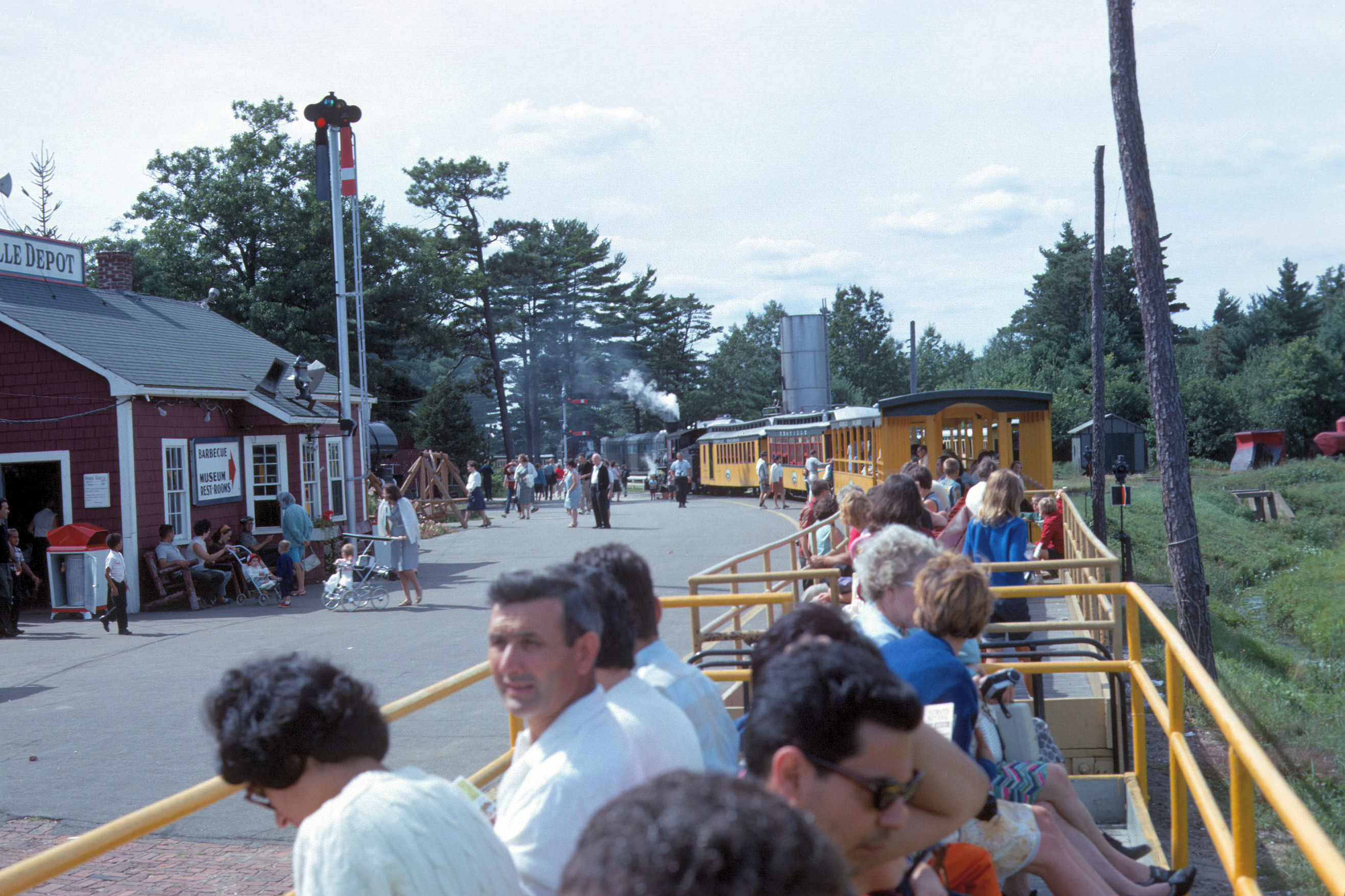
Edaville Railroad train, c. 1966, filled with visitors by the depot building.

Atwood purchased two locomotives and most of the passenger and freight cars when the Bridgton and Saco River Railroad was dismantled in 1941. After World War II he acquired two former Monson Railroad locomotives and some surviving cars from the defunct Sandy River and Rangeley Lakes Railroad in Maine. This equipment ran on 2 ft (610 mm) narrow gauge tracks, as opposed to the more common 3 ft (914 mm) narrow gauge in the western United States. Atwood purchased the equipment for use on his 1,800-acre (730 ha) cranberry farm in South Carver. After the 1945 cranberry harvest, Atwood's employees built 5.5 mi (8.9 km) of track atop the levees around the cranberry bogs. Sand and supplies were hauled in to the bogs, and cranberries were transported to a "screen house" where they were dried and then sent to market. Atwood's neighbors were enchanted with the diminutive railroad. At first, Atwood offered rides for free. When the demand for rides soared, he charged a nickel a ride. Eventually the line became less of a working railroad and more of a tourist attraction.

Atwood died in 1950, the result of injuries he received when the oil burner in the screen house exploded. His widow Elthea and nephew Dave Eldridge carried on operations at Edaville until the railroad was purchased in 1957 by F. Nelson Blount, a railroad enthusiast who had made a fortune in the seafood processing business. The Atwood Estate retained ownership of the land over which the railroad operated, a key point in later years. Blount operated Edaville for the next decade, hauling tourists behind his favorite engine #8 and displaying his ever-growing collection of locomotives. Among these was the Boston and Maine Railroad's Flying Yankee. This helped form the basis for his Steamtown, USA, collection, first operating at Keene, New Hampshire, before moving to Bellows Falls, Vermont. (It would later move and be reconstituted as the Steamtown National Historic Site in Scranton, Pennsylvania.)

Blount also leased some of the 2 ft equipment from Edaville to operate at two theme parks in the Northeast: C. V. Wood's Freedomland U.S.A. in the Bronx, New York, and Pleasure Island in Wakefield, Massachusetts. Freedomland operated their leased equipment as the "Santa Fe Rail Road" attraction, sponsored by the actual Santa Fe Railway company. The leased equipment, including steam engines Monson #3 and Monson #4 as well as several passenger cars and cabooses, was delivered to Freedomland each spring and returned to Edaville when the park closed for the season in September or October. The engines now can be found in separate museums in Maine.

=== 1967–1991 ===
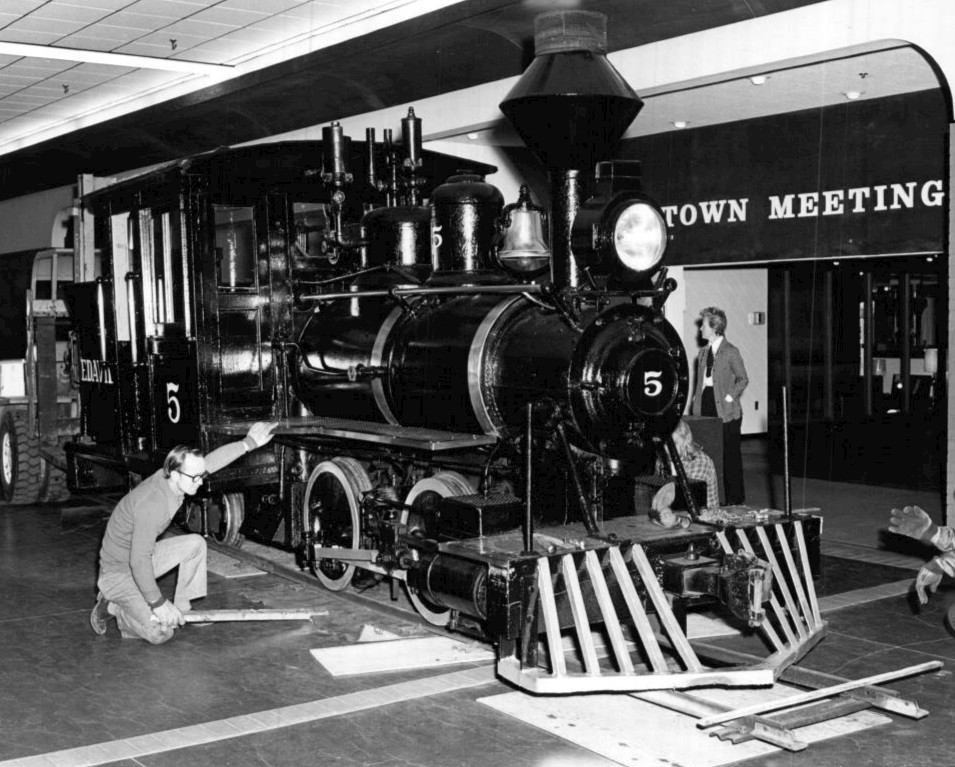
Edaville Railroad Engine No. 5

Nelson Blount died in the crash of his light airplane over Labor Day weekend in 1967. Blount's friend and right-hand man Fred Richardson continued on as general manager until the railroad was sold to George E. Bartholomew, a former Edaville employee, in 1970.

Edaville continued operations for another two decades with Bartholomew at the helm. The railroad operated tourist trains from Memorial Day thru Labor Day plus a brief, but spectacular, Festival of Lights in December. In the 1980s, Bartholomew's attention was divided between the narrow gauge Edaville, and the 4 ft 8 1/2 in (1,435 mm) standard gauge Bay Colony Railroad he was then forming, running over disused Conrail branch lines. To some observers and former employees, Edaville began to stagnate around this time, although the annual Christmas Festival of Lights continued to draw huge crowds.

In the late 1980s, after Mrs. Atwood died and the Atwood Estate evicted Edaville, Bartholomew was forced to cease operations. He eventually put the railroad up for sale in 1991.

=== 1992–2005 ===
Edaville ceased operations in January 1992 and much of the equipment was sold to a group in Portland, Maine, led by businessman Phineas T. Sprague. The equipment was to be the basis of the newly formed Maine Narrow Gauge Railroad Museum along the shores of Casco Bay. The sale generated great rancor. Many of the railroad's employees were not ready to give up on South Carver. Much of the contents of the museum, housed in the former screen house, had been auctioned off the previous fall. But the sale was closed (although the Portland museum took on a debt that would prove all but crushing in subsequent years) and locomotives 3, 4 and 8 were trucked to Portland aboard antique trucks loaned for the occasion. Locomotive #7, which was owned by Louis Edmonds, left for Maine at a later date.

Two attempts to revive Edaville during the 1990s foundered. The Edaville Entertainment Group formed an ambitious business plan to revive the park, but their relationship with the Atwood Estate (upon which the tracks were laid) turned sour. The group briefly considered moving the park to a parcel in Freetown, Massachusetts, but eventually they abandoned their effort.

South Carver Rail, led by former Edaville employees (and engineers) Paul Hallet and Rick Knight, operated the hastily refurbished #7 for Fred Richardson's 80th birthday at Edaville, and ran trains during the Cranberry Festival over a Columbus Day weekend in the mid-1990s, even managing to borrow Monson #3 from Maine. Ultimately, their efforts to reopen the park failed, and it was the last time that the "original" Edaville locomotives ran over the line.

In 1999, the new Edaville Railroad opened for operation. Owned and operated by construction company owner Jack Flagg, developer John Delli Priscoli and cranberry grower Douglas Beaton, the railroad acquired a "new" steam locomotive, #21 Anne Elizabeth, built by the English firm of Hudswell Clarke and a veteran of the Fiji sugar industry. Several of the original Edaville buildings, including the station and the engine house, were demolished with new buildings taking their place. Plans called for the construction of a roundhouse, served by the original turntable, with an enlarged collection of locomotives and rolling stock.

During December 2000, the wheels on one of a car's four axles came off the tracks, causing a derailment. On November 25, 2001, the same thing happened. A family from Weymouth, Massachusetts, was jolted when the train car they were riding in derailed and slid into the dirt.

=== 2005–2022 ===
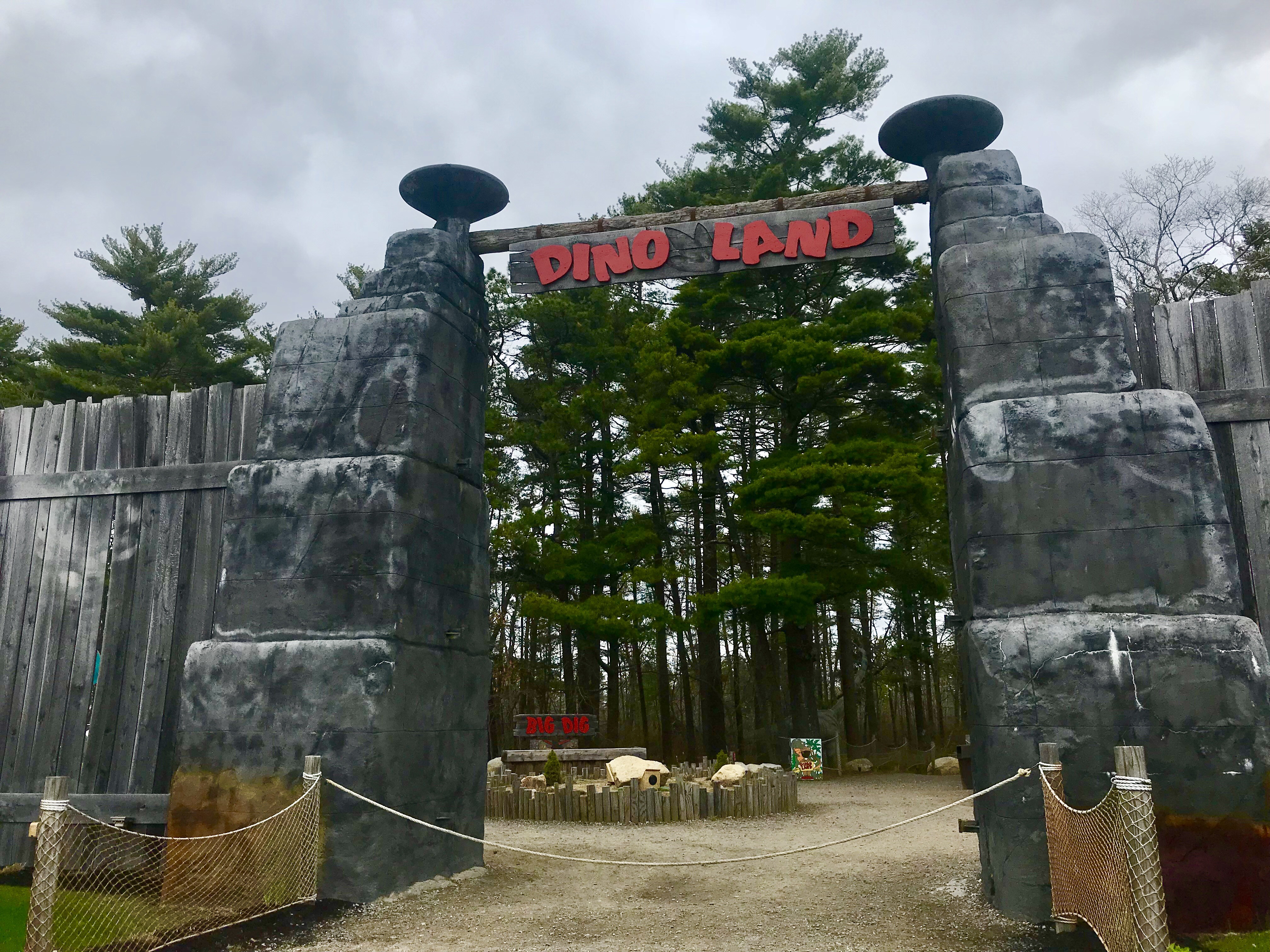
The main entrance to Dino-Land, opened in 2014

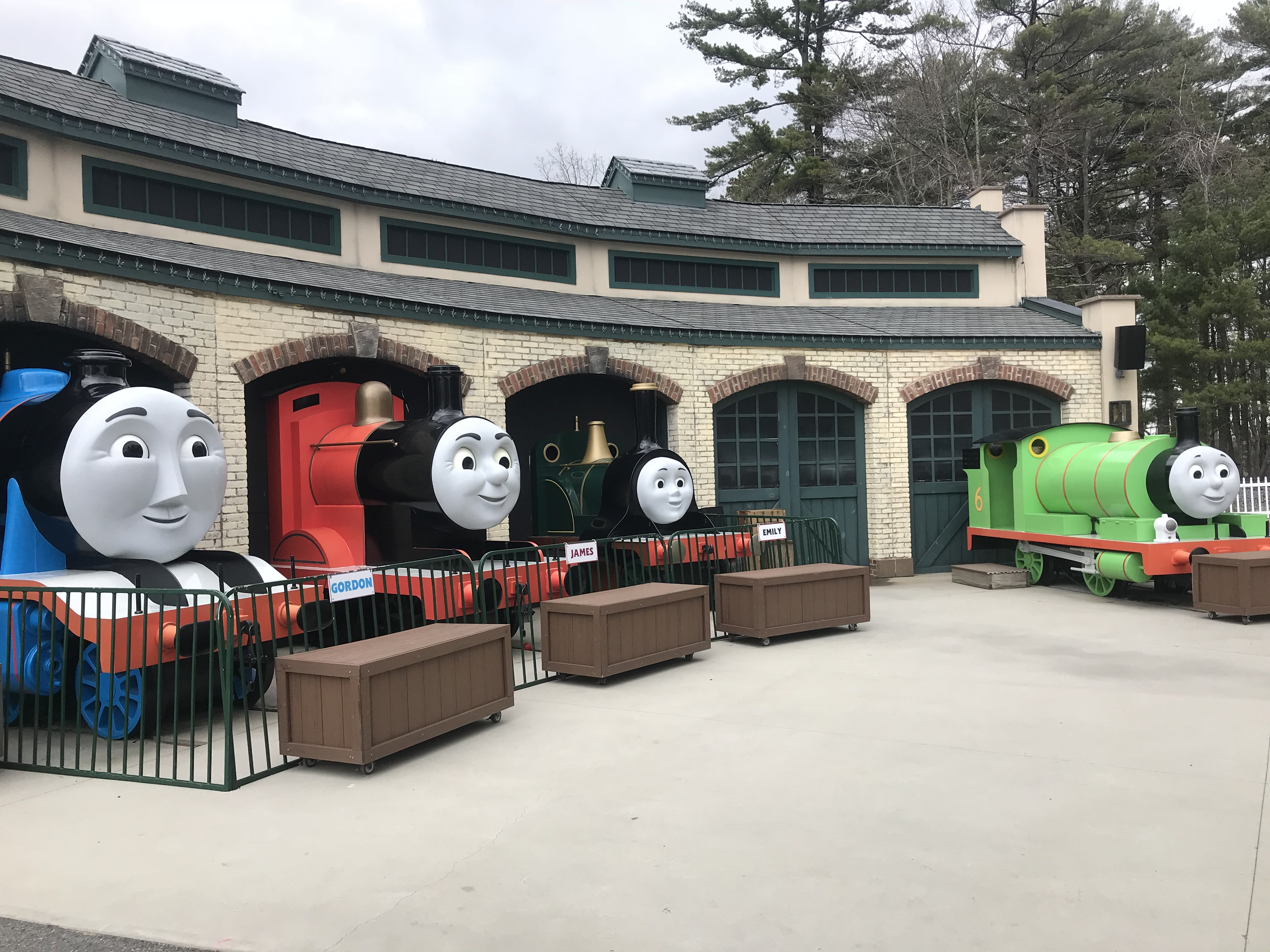
The Tidmouth Sheds attraction at Thomas Land

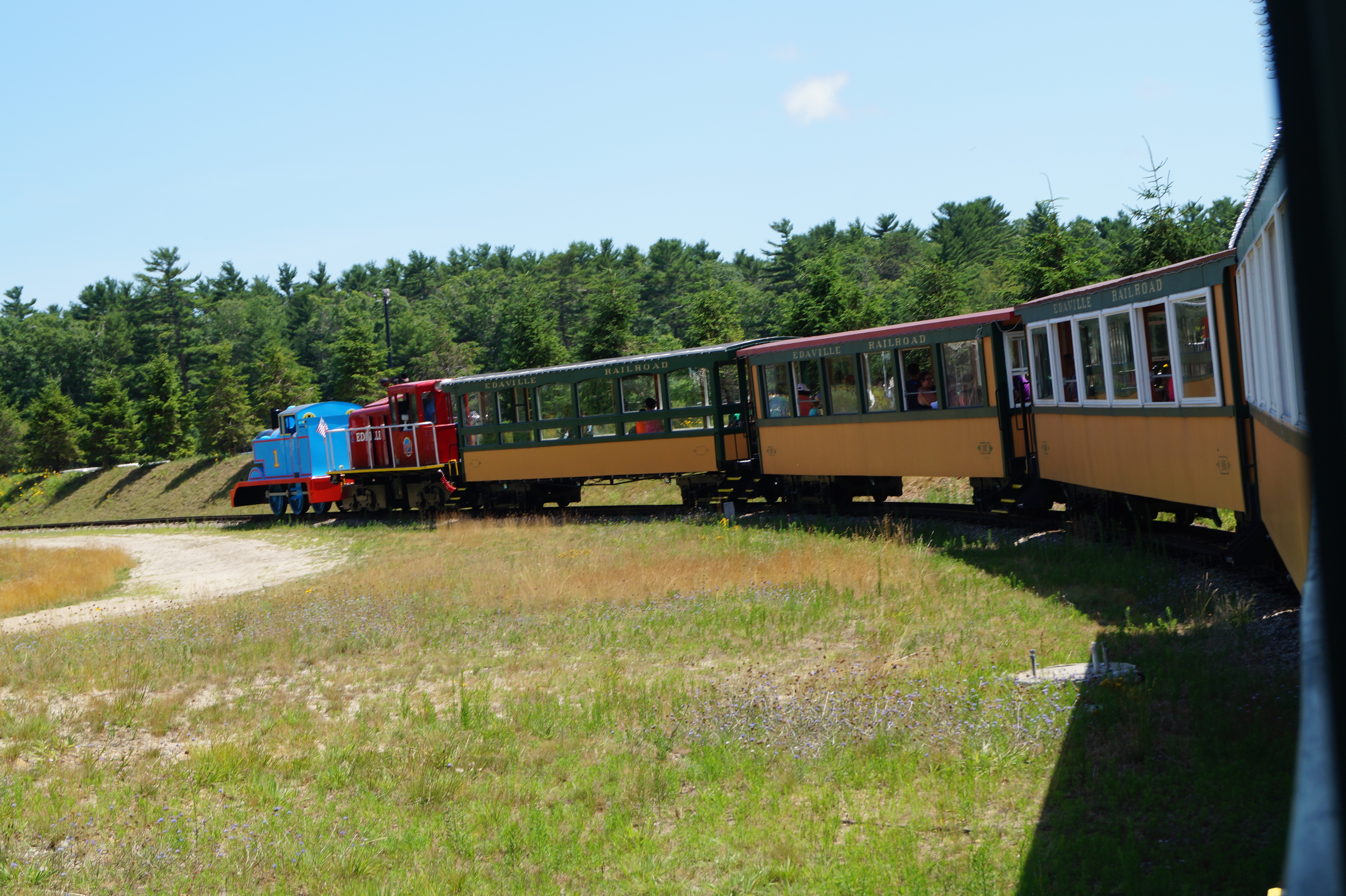
Edaville Old Train Ride

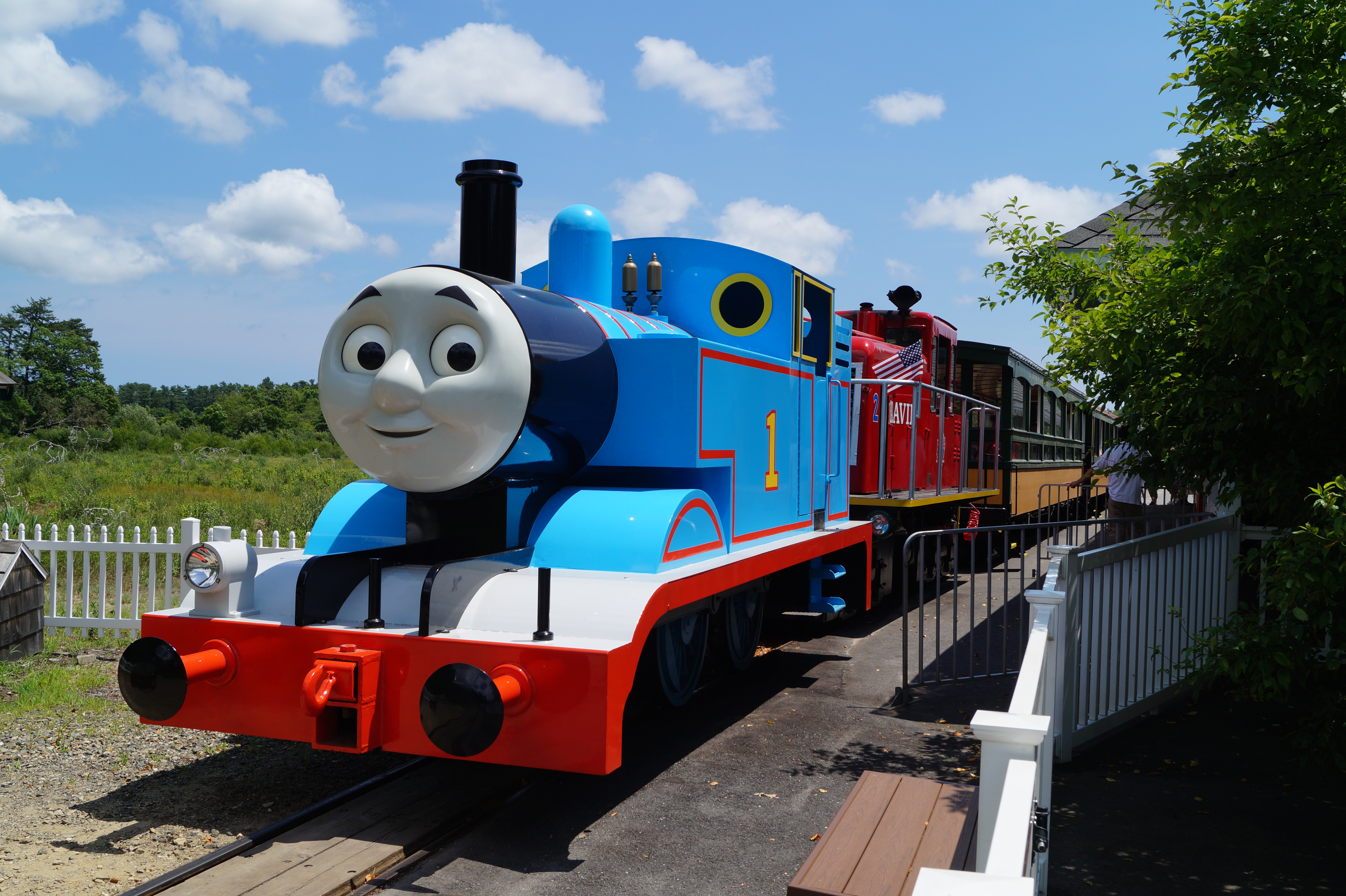
The unpowered Thomas engine

Ownership of Edaville Railroad and its land came to rest exclusively with Jon Delli Priscoli by 2005. Ownership of the Atwood property was taken up by Delli Priscoli, and he bought out his partner Jack Flagg, becoming the sole owner of the railroad. While this put an end to the landlord-railroad problem which had dogged Edaville for many years, it also heralded the end of "old" Edaville. The area around the milepost called "Mt. Urann" was developed as a housing subdivision, meaning that the track running across the new lots had to be stripped off. Late in 2005, the last run of the railroad took place over the "original line," hauled by oil-fired locomotive number 21, which had undergone cosmetic renovation to look more like a Maine railroad. After stripping off the tracks at Mt. Urann, the main line became a 2-mile (3.2 km) loop, comprising half of the circuit around the old reservoir.

In late 2010, the Edaville operators announced that they would not seek to renew their operating lease with Delli Priscoli. Delli Priscoli then put the railroad up for sale for $10 million, and eventually found a potential buyer. However, Priscolli found that the buyer did not intend to continue operating the park, and declined the offer, opting instead to rebuild the park. The restored railroad reopened in September 2011. The following year, the park began a three-year reconstruction project, which included the installation of additional attractions, refurbishing and repainting existing rides, adding additional parking, and building a new main street entrance and guest services area.

In the years under Priscoli, Edaville Railroad reopened under the rebranding Edaville Family Theme Park, an amusement park themed around cranberry harvesting and railroading. Initially consisting of one region containing a few dozen rides and the signature heritage railroad, the park underwent several years of construction from 2004 to 2007, which included the construction of two adjacent regions with additional rides and attractions, as well as an overhaul of the main region. By 2020, the park consisted of three large interconnected areas, each with different themes. The main area, referred to as "Cran Central", featured 32 amusement rides primarily (but not exclusively) themed around cranberry harvesting, including a Ferris wheel and tilt-a-whirl. Cran Central also housed the park's main train station, where passengers boarded and disembarked on the train. For several years, the trains were led by an unpowered engine reminiscent of Thomas the Tank Engine, and powered by a small diesel engine at the rear. The second region was a large dinosaur-themed attraction entitled "Dino-Land", which opened in 2014. Open primarily during the summer and fall months, Dino-Land contained a staff-guided walking trail through woodlands featuring 23 life-sized animatronic dinosaurs, as well as a variety of dinosaur-themed games, retail, and activities. The third region, entitled "Thomas Land USA", opened on August 15, 2015, and was based on the British children's television series Thomas & Friends, especially the Island of Sodor. Thomas Land had 11 rides, most of which are based on those from England's Thomas Land, and featured characters including Harold the Helicopter, Cranky the Crane, Toby and the Troublesome Trucks. The park included audio-animatronic trains, a stage show and dining locations.

As of April 13, 2022, Delli Priscoli put Edaville back on the market. "The family amusement park closed due to the coronavirus pandemic, and except for the return of the annual Christmas Festival of Lights late last year, has remain closed. Delli Priscoli said Edaville fell into the final COVID-19 reopening phase and has not received any federal or local financial relief. ... One option he is exploring is an expansion referred to as Edaville 2.0, showcasing a year-round facility with the expansion of indoor and outdoor venues featuring shopping, dining and entertainment. In addition to transitioning Edaville to new ownership, Priscoli will work to reposition a portion of the land holdings not central to the park for a master-planned residential development to meet Carver’s requirement to follow the MBTA’s community zoning initiative for a 50-acre [20 ha] parcel for multifamily housing or he will pursue a Chapter 40B affordable housing project on the site. ... While he hopes to have a new owner in place later this summer, he is planning to reopen it himself one last time."

=== 2022–2024 ===
Edaville Family Theme Park
- Interactive map of Edaville Family Theme Park
- Opened: 2001
- Closed: 2024
- Owner: Jon Delli Priscoli
- Operating season: May through October
- Area: 230 acres (0.93 km^{2})

Attractions
- Total: 20
- Roller coasters: 1
- Website: www.edaville.com

On August 10, 2022, Edavile was off the market, and new operators were announced. "Rest assured, Edaville is no longer for sale," the park said in a Facebook post. "The new operators, Shervin B. Hawley, Managing Partner of Sudbury, MA, and Brian Fanslau, Operations Partner and owner of Maine Locomotive & Machine Works of Alna, ME, are committed to the long-term success of Edaville as a traditional family park centered on its historic steam locomotives and family-oriented activities."

As part of the rebranding, when the park reopened for the 2022 holiday season, Dino Land and Thomas Land remained closed indefinitely, and the unpowered Thomas locomotive was no longer used to lead the trains, being replaced by authentic coal-fired steam engines. However, a new "European-Style Christmas Market" was introduced, featuring both new and old shops, as well as many attractions and rides not part of Dino Land and Thomas Land. Additionally, a new pricing structure was implemented, including an option for a season pass. Thomas Land later reopened under the name Alpine Village in 2023.

In line with the park's rebranded focus on traditional railroad history, the park's two-foot gauge railroad is still in use during the summer and fall months, offering daily excursions through the surrounding cranberry bogs and special holiday-themed excursions during the late fall and early winter. Typical trains consist of six to eight enclosed passenger cars, one open-top passenger car, and an enclosed caboose, all led by a coal-fired steam engine. The park currently operates Edaville No. 11, a 1925-built steam engine that was previously a static attraction at the park until being retrofitted for use in the 2022 season, and also is in the process of having another engine, the 1936-built Edaville No. 21, restored to working condition for future use.

Following an announced closure and auction in March 2025, the park was reorganized under new management and did not permanently cease operations. Later in 2025, it reopened with a new seasonal focus as Edaville Historic Train & Festival of Lights. The property is now also the permanent home of King Richard's Faire, which operates on a separate schedule from the Festival of Lights event.

== See also ==
- List of amusement parks in New England
- List of heritage railroads in the United States
- Rail transport in Walt Disney Parks and Resorts
