= Carver, Massachusetts =

- Town
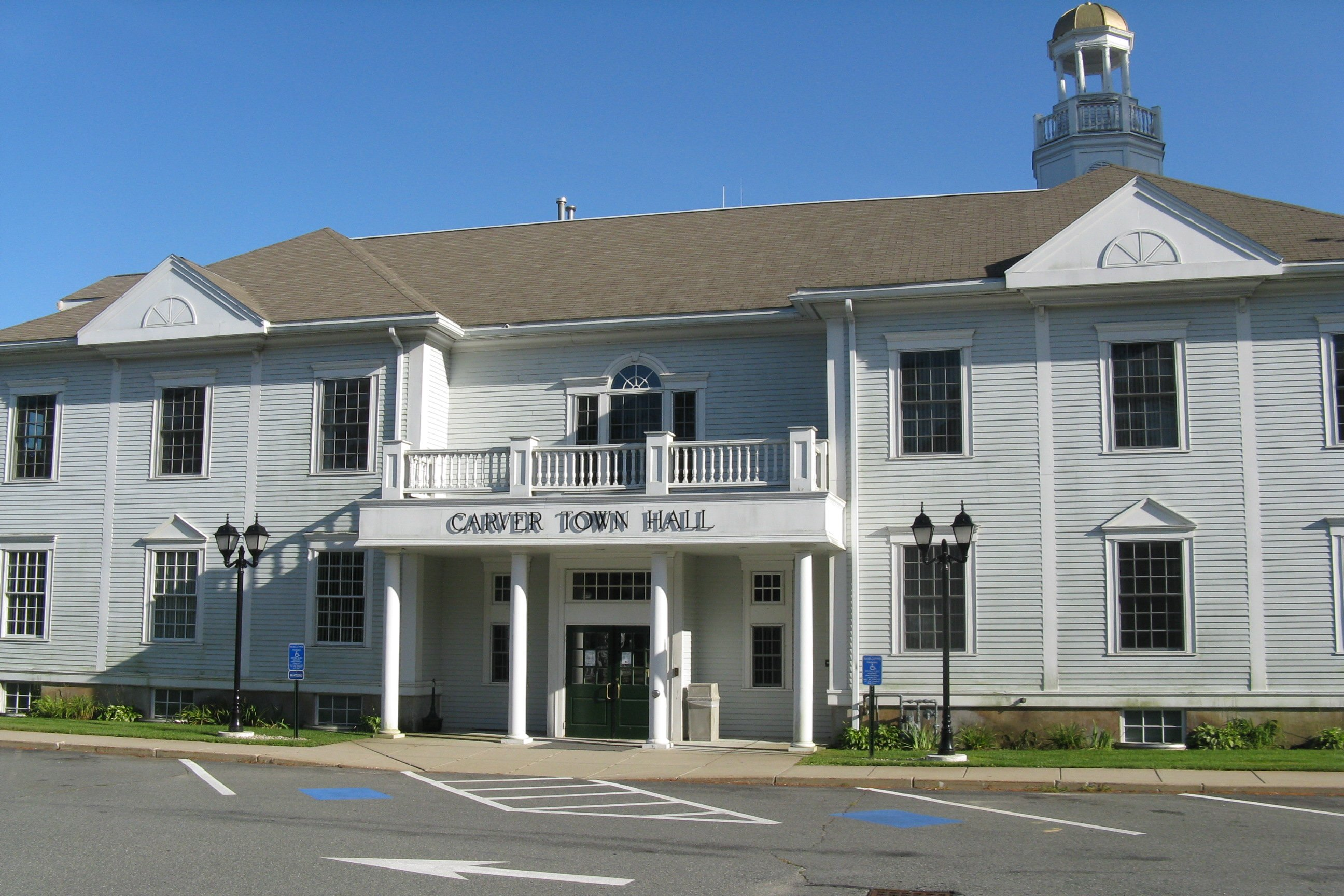
- Town Hall

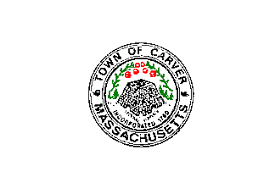
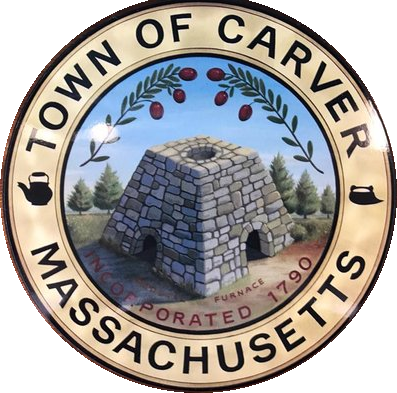
- Flag Seal

- Location in Plymouth County in Massachusetts
- Coordinates: 41°53′00″N 70°45′47″W
- Country: United States
- State: Massachusetts
- County: Plymouth
- Settled: 1660
- Incorporated: 1790

Government
  - Type: Open town meeting

Area
  - Total: 39.7 sq mi (102.9 km^{2})
  - Land: 37.4 sq mi (96.9 km^{2})
  - Water: 2.3 sq mi (6.0 km^{2})
- Elevation: 92 ft (28 m)

Population (2020)
  - Total: 11,645
  - Density: 311/sq mi (120/km^{2})
- Time zone: UTC-5 (Eastern)
  - Summer (DST): UTC-4 (Eastern)
- ZIP code: 02330
- Area code: 508 / 774
- FIPS code: 25-11665
- GNIS feature ID: 0618337
- Website: https://www.carverma.gov/

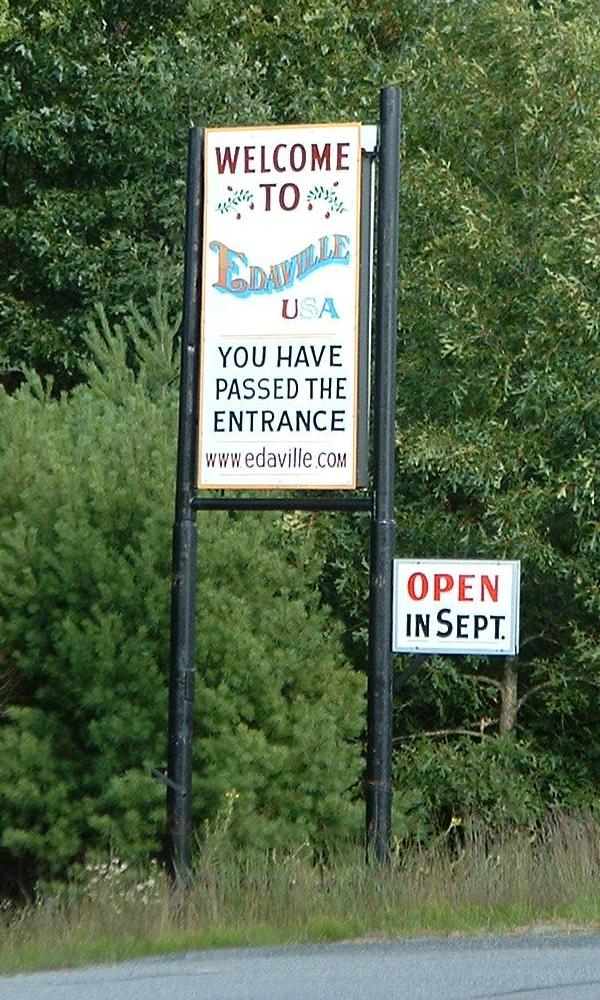
A sign for Edaville Railroad along Route 58

Carver is a town in Plymouth County, Massachusetts, United States. The population was 11,645 at the 2020 census. It is named for John Carver, the first governor of the Plymouth Colony. The town features two popular tourist attractions: Edaville USA theme park and King Richard's Faire, the largest and longest-running renaissance fair in New England.

== History and overview ==
Archaeological research revealed 9,000 years of human habitation at the Annasnappet Pond Site in Carver, from 10,000 to 1,000 years ago. The site contained 100,000 stone flakes, 1,600 stone tools and a human burial.

Carver separated from Plympton, Massachusetts, and was incorporated in 1790 because many residents lived too far away to attend church in Plympton. The town was named for John Carver, the first Governor of the Plymouth Colony. Initially agricultural, Carver was known for the iron ore from its swamp lands used to make cooking tools by the 1730s. The first iron works was "Pope's Point Furnace", built in 1732, which operated for a century by using the bogs and Sampson's Pond. Over the next 150 years, sheep shearing and lumber mills were important in Carver.

Most people at the time lived in the villages of South and North Carver and Wenham, later called East Carver. European settlers had also given the names "Colchester" and "Lakenham" to what is now North Carver, and settled in what was known as South Meadow. Each village supported at least one schoolhouse. As the market for iron ore declined in the latter part of the 19th century, Carver began cranberry farming as a new use for the town's swamp lands. Farmers began growing cranberries in the 1870s, and by 1900 it was Carver's farmers who raised a fifth of all cranberries grown in the United States. A railroad line connected Carver to New York and Boston in 1920, further establishing the town.

Money from the iron helped the community to grow, as evidenced by several mansions still in existence in the town. Also located in Carver is Savery's Avenue, the first divided highway in America, which was opened to the public in 1860 by William Savery. The trees between the roads and on the outside of them were to be left for "shade and ornament for man and beast". Both road beds were macadamized in 1907. A portion of the expense was advanced by the daughters of the builder, Mrs. Mary P.S. Jowitt and Ms. H.D. Savery. By the 1940s the cranberry harvest was the largest in the world, and today it is still a major business in town. Because of the land taken for the bogs, however, growth is limited, giving the town a rural flavor it takes pride in. In 2012, most cranberry bogs are being replanted in favor of a new hybrid cranberry crop.

Carver also has two notable tourist attractions. Edaville Railroad is a narrow-gauge railroad attraction which opened in 1949. It has long been a family tourist attraction in Southeastern Massachusetts, especially for its festival of lights around Christmastime. It has experienced a revival in recent years, after being sold in 1991 and nearly closing. The town is also the site of King Richard's Faire, a re-creation of a 16th-century English fair which is open on weekends throughout September and October. It is New England's largest Renaissance fair.

Pro wrestler Mike Bennett is from Carver.

== Geography ==
According to the United States Census Bureau, the town has a total area of 40 square miles (103 km^{2}), of which 37.4 square miles (96.9 km^{2}) is land and 2.3 square miles (6.0 km^{2}), or 5.87%, is water. It is locally famous for the large number of cranberry bogs throughout the town. Carver is bordered by Plympton to the north, Kingston to the northeast, Plymouth to the east, Wareham to the south, and Middleborough to the west. Carver is located approximately 45 miles (72 km) south-southeast of Boston and 38 miles (61 km) east of Providence, Rhode Island.

Carver's geography is shaped by its many small brooks, rivers and ponds including Vaughn Pond and Bates Pond. The majority of them eventually drain into Buzzards Bay, although some in the north of town lead to Cape Cod Bay or Narragansett Bay. The town also has an abundance of pine and cedar trees, and a portion of Myles Standish State Forest takes up much of the southeast corner of town. A large cedar swamp occupies the geographic center of the town. The town is also the site of a campground, a sportsmen's club, and a small town park at the center of town.

== Demographics ==
Historical population
Year	Pop.	±%
1790	847	—
1850	1,186	+40.0%
1860	1,186	+0.0%
1870	1,092	−7.9%
1880	1,039	−4.9%
1890	994	−4.3%
1900	1,104	+11.1%
1910	1,668	+51.1%
1920	891	−46.6%
1930	1,381	+55.0%
1940	1,469	+6.4%
1950	1,530	+4.2%
1960	1,949	+27.4%
1970	2,420	+24.2%
1980	6,988	+188.8%
1990	10,590	+51.5%
2000	11,163	+5.4%
2010	11,509	+3.1%
2020	11,645	+1.2%
2022*	11,626	−0.2%
* = population estimate. Source: United States census records and Population Estimates Program data.

As of the census of 2000, there were 11,163 people, 3,984 households, and 3,011 families residing in the town. The population density was 297.3 inhabitants per square mile (114.8/km^{2}). There were 4,127 housing units at an average density of 109.9 per square mile (42.4/km^{2}). The racial makeup of the town was 95.78% White, 1.22% African American, 0.10% Native American, 0.30% Asian, 0.01% Pacific Islander, 0.96% from other races, and 1.63% from two or more races. Hispanic or Latino of any race were 0.82% of the population.

The largest self-reported ancestry groups in East Carver are Irish (37.0%), Italian (26.5%), English (23.5%), French (6.8%) and Portuguese (5.4%)

There were 3,984 households, out of which 36.6% had children under the age of 18 living with them, 63.3% were married couples living together, 8.7% had a female householder with no husband present, and 24.4% were non-families. 19.7% of all households were made up of individuals, and 11.7% had someone living alone who was 65 years of age or older. The average household size was 2.80 and the average family size was 3.23.

In the town, the population was spread out, with 27.3% under the age of 18, 6.9% from 18 to 24, 28.3% from 25 to 44, 22.8% from 45 to 64, and 14.8% who were 65 years of age or older. The median age was 37 years. For every 100 females, there were 95.6 males. For every 100 females age 18 and over, there were 90.9 males.

The median income for a household in the town was $53,506, and the median income for a family was $61,738. Males had a median income of $46,414 versus $28,336 for females. The per capita income for the town was $20,398. About 4.6% of families and 5.0% of the population were below the poverty line, including 3.1% of those under age 18 and 10.8% of those age 65 or over.

== Government ==
Carver is represented in the Massachusetts House of Representatives as a part of the Second Plymouth district, which also includes Wareham and a portion of Middleborough. The town is represented in the Massachusetts Senate as a part of the First Plymouth and Bristol district, which includes Berkley, Bridgewater, Dighton, Marion, Middleborough, Raynham, Taunton and Wareham. The town is patrolled by the Fourth (Middleborough) Barracks of Troop D of the Massachusetts State Police.

On the national level, Carver is a part of Massachusetts's 9th congressional district, and is currently represented by Bill Keating. The state's senior (Class I) member of the United States Senate, elected in 2012, is Elizabeth Warren. The junior (Class II) senator is Ed Markey, who was elected in 2013 to finish John Kerry's term when he became Secretary of State.

Carver presidential election results
Year	Democratic	Republican	Third parties	Blanks/Other	Total Votes	Margin
2024	42.07% 3,022	54.91% 3,945	1.55% 111	1.48% 106	7,814	12.84%
2020	46.81% 3,277	50.05% 3,504	1.91% 134	1.23% 86	7,001	3.24%
2016	39.72% 2,529	50.35% 3,206	6.93% 441	3% 191	6,367	10.63%
2012	47.33% 2,872	51.12% 3,111	1.13% 69	0.56% 34	6,068	3.79%
2008	47.55% 2,937	46.96% 2,901	1.6% 99	3.89% 240	6,177	0.59%
2004	51.95% 3,054	46.45% 2,731	0.9% 53	0.7% 41	5,879	5.5%
2000	54.3% 2,971	38.89% 2,089	5.49% 295	1.32% 71	5,372	15.41%
1996	53.07% 2,586	29.82% 1,453	15.25% 743	1.87% 91	4,873	23.25%
1992	36.16% 1,875	31.41% 1,629	32.16% 1,668	0.27% 14	5,186	4.75%
1988	43.38% 2087	53.61% 2579	1.41% 68	1.6% 77	4811	10.23%
1984	37.36% 1404	61.87% 2325	0.4% 15	0.37% 14	3758	24.51%
1980	44.16% 2087	54.57% 2579	0.57% 37	0.7% 33	2,878	10.41%
1976	53.66% 1062	41.79% 827	2.48% 49	2.07% 41	1,979	11.87%
1972	43.61% 570	54.17% 708	0.54% 7	1.68% 22	1,307	10.56%

Carver is governed by the open town meeting form of government, led by a town administrator and a board of selectmen. Carver has its own police, ALS ambulance, and fire departments, with a central police station, central ambulance station, and three on-call firehouses, located in the north, south, and center of town.

There are also three post offices. The main ZIP code is 02330. There are also 2 other P.O. Box zip codes, 02355 (North Carver Post Office) and 02366 (South Carver Post Office). The town's public library is located in the center of town, and is a part of the SAILS Library Network.

== Education ==
Carver operates its own school department, led by a school committee and a superintendent of schools. There are two schools, each of which serves specific grade levels. The Carver Elementary serves pre-kindergarten through fifth grades; and the Carver Middle-High School serves sixth through twelfth grades.

In addition to the town high school, students may also choose to attend Old Colony Regional Vocational Technical High School in Rochester. They may also choose to attend Norfolk County Agricultural High School in Walpole or Bristol County Agricultural High School in Dighton. There are no private schools in the town; the nearest are in Kingston, Lakeville and Taunton.

=== Transportation Department ===
Carver operates and owns their own buses for Carver and all out of district schools except Old Colony Regional. For the middle-high school they used to run a late bus Monday to Thursday, and not on half days, but stopped in 2023.

== Transportation ==
The town is crossed in the north of town by U.S. Route 44, a two-lane divided highway which meets Route 3 in Plymouth. The highway was recently expanded, so that rather than the highway portion ending at Route 58 (the other main route), whose right-of-way extends into Carver to a few miles after the Carver/Wareham town line. The closest MBTA Commuter Rail stations are Kingston and Middleborough, located in their neighboring towns. The nearest national and international airport is Logan International Airport in Boston. Another national and international airport nearby is T. F. Green Airport in Warwick, Rhode Island, which most residents prefer due to short security wait times.
