= Sterling District No. 5 Schoolhouse =

- U.S. National Register of Historic Places
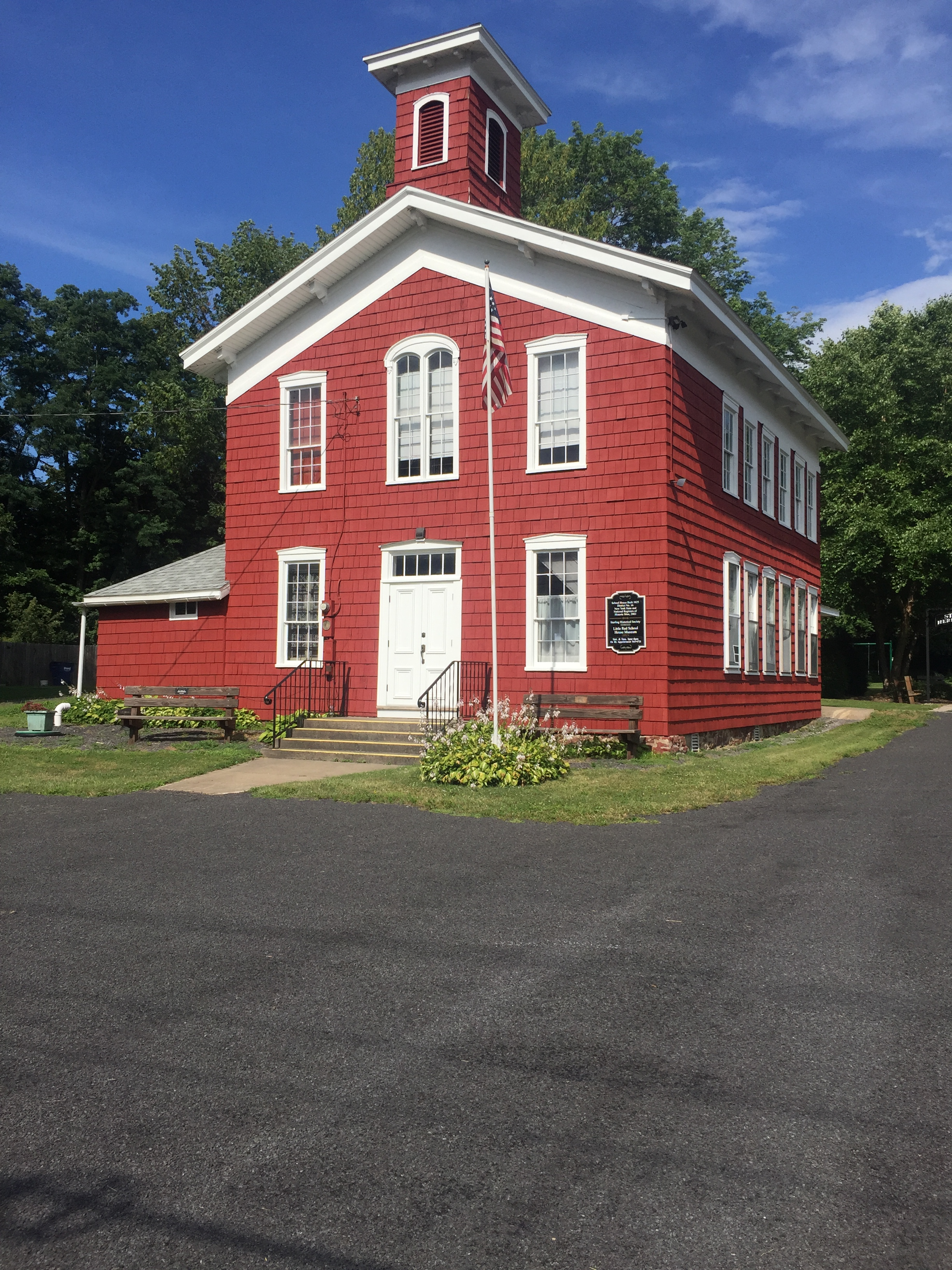

- Location within New York Location within the United States
- Location: NY104A, Sterling, New York
- Coordinates: 43°19′25″N 76°38′51″W
- Area: less than one acre
- Built: 1853
- Architectural style: Italian Villa
- NRHP reference No.: 02001119
- Added to NRHP: October 10, 2002

Sterling District No. 5 Schoolhouse is a historic school building located at Sterling in Cayuga County, New York. It was built about 1853 and is a two-story hewn timber frame building with a front-facing gable roof, built above a mortared rubble stone foundation. It is rectangular in shape and measures 28 feet by 38 feet. It was used as a school into the 1950s. It has since been used by the Sterling Historical Society for museum display space and as the Town Hall.

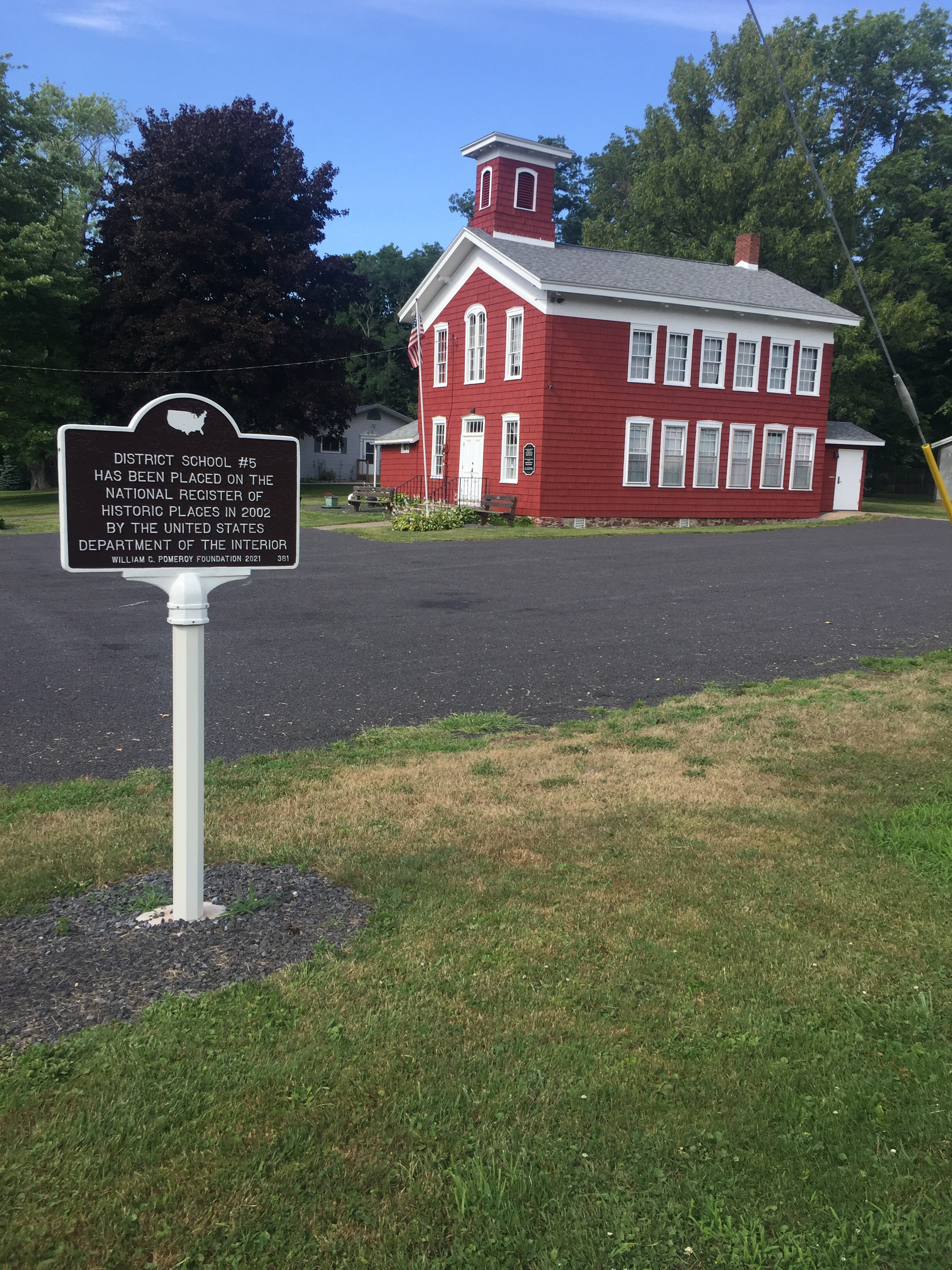
Building in 2022

It was listed on the National Register of Historic Places in 2002.

It is now the Sterling Historical Society Museum.
