= Sterling Grist Mill Complex =

- U.S. National Register of Historic Places
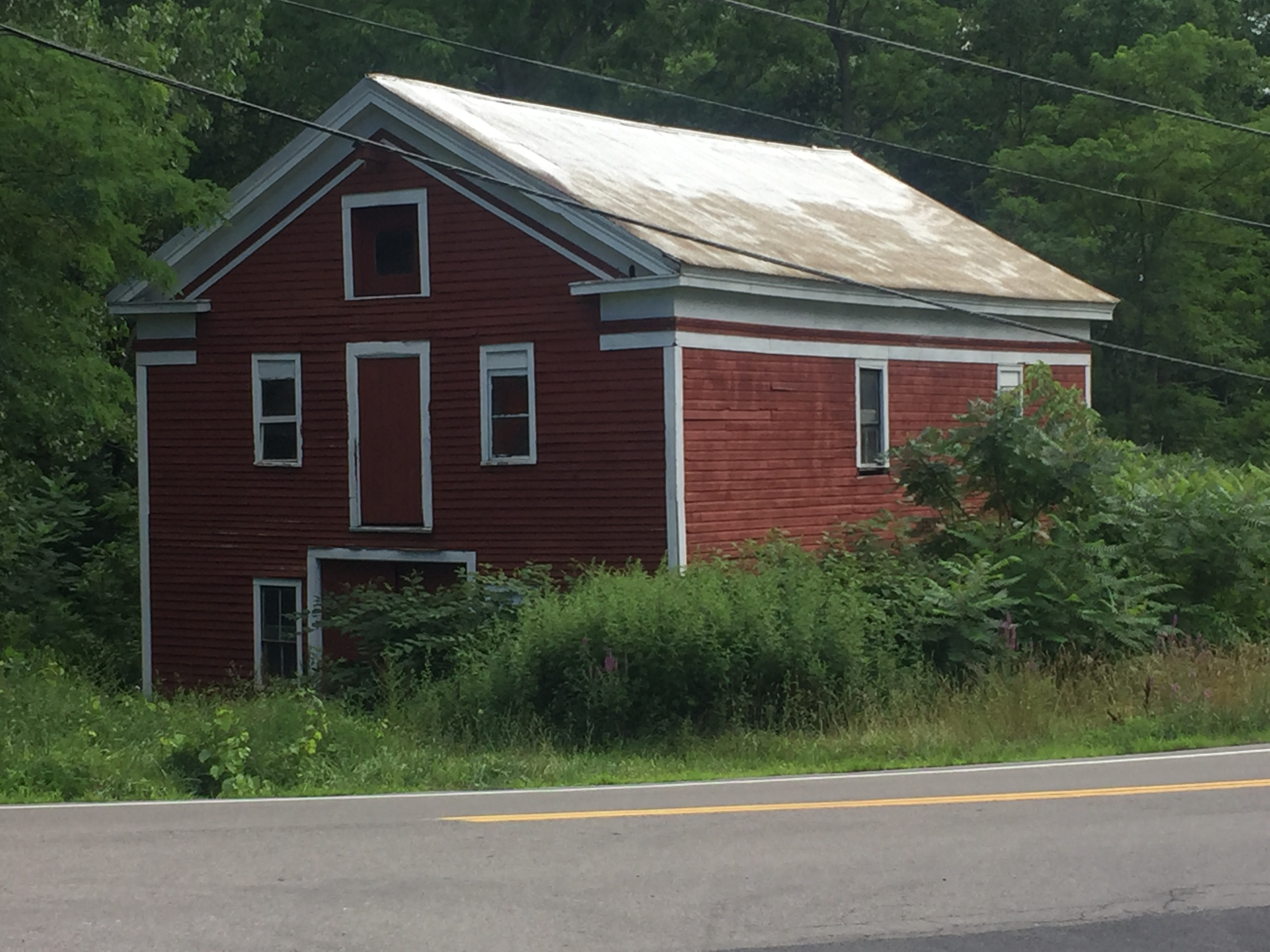

- Location within New York Location within the United States
- Location: 1332 NY 104A, Sterling, New York
- Coordinates: 43°19′31″N 76°38′49″W
- Area: less than one acre
- Built: 1813
- Architectural style: Greek Revival
- NRHP reference No.: 01001498
- Added to NRHP: January 24, 2002

Sterling Grist Mill Complex is a historic grist mill complex located at Sterling in Cayuga County, New York. The complex consists of a frame mill building built about 1835, the rubble foundation of an 1859 tannery, and a dam and penstock built about 1900. The mill building is built with a hand-hewn heavy timber frame sheathed in narrow pine clapboard.

It was listed on the National Register of Historic Places in 2002.
