= Fair Haven, New York =

- Village
- Location within the state of New York
- Coordinates: 43°19′27″N 76°42′19″W
- Country: United States
- State: New York
- County: Cayuga
- Town: Sterling

Area
  - Total: 2.93 sq mi (7.60 km^{2})
  - Land: 1.76 sq mi (4.56 km^{2})
  - Water: 1.17 sq mi (3.04 km^{2})
- Elevation: 285 ft (87 m)

Population (2020)
  - Total: 760
  - Density: 431.6/sq mi (166.63/km^{2})
- Time zone: UTC-5 (Eastern (EST))
  - Summer (DST): UTC-4 (EDT)
- ZIP code: 13064
- Area code: 315
- FIPS code: 36-24988
- GNIS feature ID: 949802
- Website: Village website

Fair Haven is a village located on the southern shore of Lake Ontario in Cayuga County, New York, United States. As of the 2020 census, its population was 760. Fair Haven is within the town of Sterling and is northwest of Syracuse. The village is on Little Sodus Bay, an arm of Lake Ontario.

== History ==
The village first gained prominence as a port on the south shore of Lake Ontario. The openings in the sand bars on Little Sodus Bay were widened and protected by jetties in the middle of the 19th century, thus improving the shipping capabilities of Fair Haven. The west pier was later marked with a wooden outer lighthouse with a fourth order Fresnel lens and in 1873 a light keepers house was built on shore which still stands. Sometime later an inner lighthouse was added.

The Southern Central Railroad served Fair Haven, from 1872 until 1887 when it was absorbed by the Lehigh Valley Railroad. Summer tourists arrived by rail from Auburn and other inland towns to enjoy the parks on the waterfront.which were known for having the very best sand beaches on Lake Ontario. The railroad also carried coal up from Athens, Pennsylvania to a 1500 foot wooden trestle built on the east shore of Little Sodus Bay. The coal was then loaded and shipped by sail freighter to Canada and Ice was harvested from the bay and shipped back by rail to New York City. The trestle was torn down in 1937, a year after the spur was abandoned. When its use as a port waned, the village continued to flourish as a prime recreational destination thanks to the new State Park.

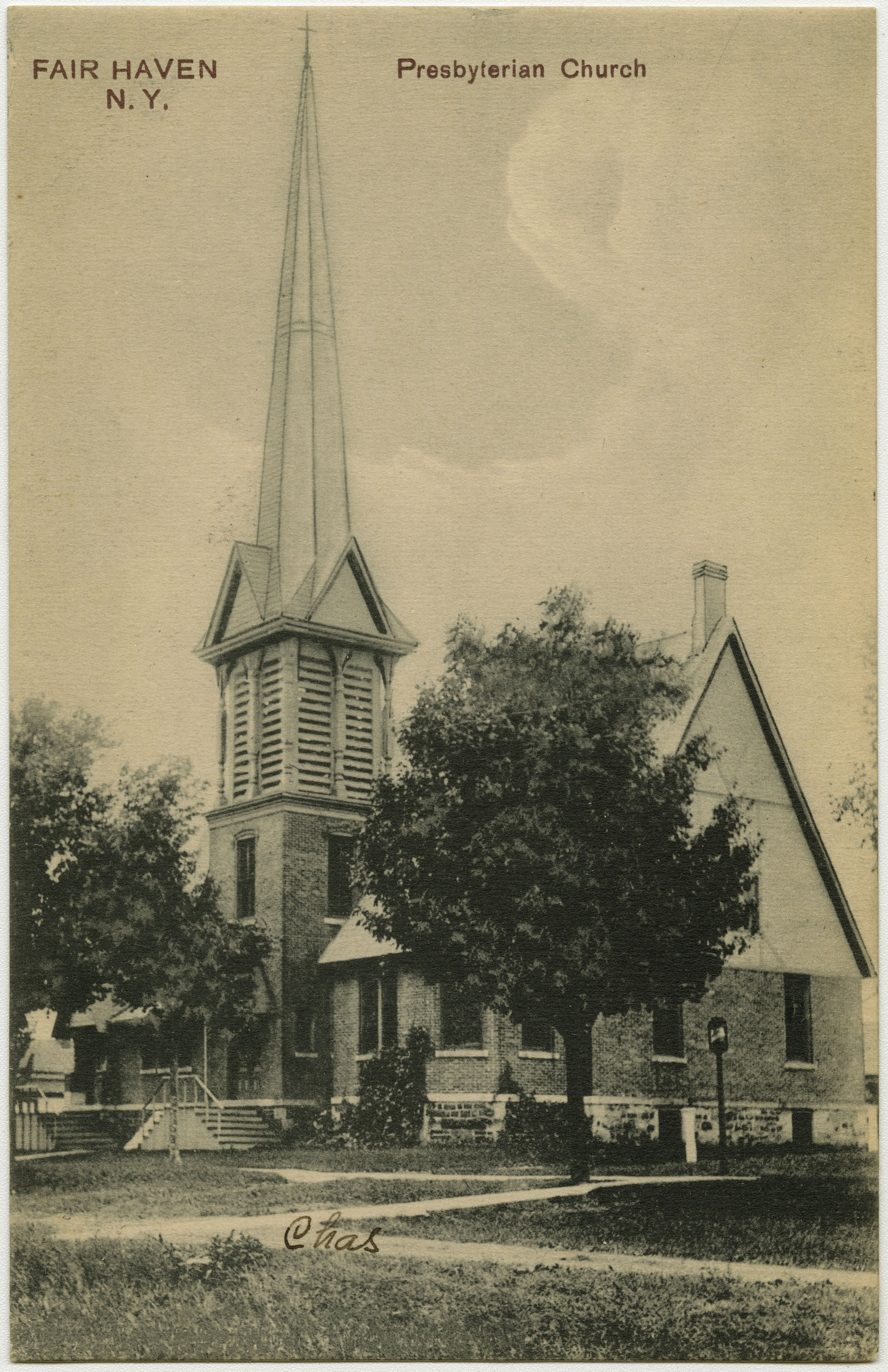
Postcard image of 1882-built Presbyterian church, now the Fair Haven Community Church.

The Presbyterian church, whose brick building of 1882 replaced a former building destroyed by fire, was united with the local Methodist church in 1928. It is now the Fair Haven Community Church.

In the late 1920s land acquisitions had begun for creation of Fair Haven Beach State Park with construction starting around 1930 using labor provided by the Civilian Conservation Corps.

The Little Red School House Museum located at 1294 State Route 104A, Sterling, New York preserves Fair Haven's Railroad heritage with two floors of exhibits and a functioning railroad hand pump car that visitors are welcome to ride.

Camping, swimming, fishing and recreational boating are popular now, and the bay is ringed with cottages and year-round residences. There has been an active yacht club on the west shore for over a century, and many sailboats are seen during the summer. The Pleasant Beach Hotel, located on the east shore, opened in 1910 and is still in operation today.

The history of Fair Haven has been well documented by photographer Edna Williams (1883-1967) and several writers, most recently Robert Kolsters who has two books, Looking Back at Fair Haven (ISBN 978-0-9726841-2-5), loaded with historic pictures and other information. There is an active historical association in nearby Sterling that operates a museum in the Red Schoolhouse. Susan Peterson Gately (Passages on Inland Waters ISBN 0-9646149-2-8) has a section devoted to the work of Edna Williams containing a biography by June MacArthur, curator for the Edna Williams photographic collection.

Cottage Farm, on Richmond Avenue next to the Community Church, was listed on the National Register of Historic Places in 2012.

== Geography ==
Fair Haven is located at 43°19′27″N 76°42′19″W (43.324175, -76.705154). This is 31 miles (50 km) north of Auburn and 14 miles (23 km) southwest of Oswego. Kingston, Ontario, Canada, is 55 miles (89 km) to the north across Lake Ontario.

According to the United States Census Bureau, the village has a total area of 2.9 square miles (7.6 km^{2}), of which 1.7 square miles (4.5 km^{2}) is land and 1.2 square miles (3.0 km^{2}), or 39.96%, is water.

Fair Haven is located around Little Sodus Bay, a bay on the south shore of Lake Ontario. The bay is bounded on the west, east and south by drumlins and on the north by Lake Ontario. The lake level is 245 feet (75 m) above sea level, and the bay averages 30 feet (9.1 m) in depth with several protected coves and anchorages. One well marked reef hazard ("Grass Island"), approximately 800 feet (240 m) long (N-S) and 100 feet (30 m) wide (E-W) with a depth of only 2 feet (0.6 m), is located in the northwest corner of the bay out of the main channel. There are two active marinas on the bay, Fair Point at the north end and Chinook Harbor at the south end.

NY Route 104A passes through the village. Fair Haven Beach State Park is located on Lake Ontario at the northern edge of the village.

== Demographics ==
Historical population
Census	Pop.	Note	%±
1870	532		—
1880	621		16.7%
1890	738		18.8%
1900	610		−17.3%
1910	571		−6.4%
1920	552		−3.3%
1930	562		1.8%
1940	471		−16.2%
1950	628		33.3%
1960	764		21.7%
1970	859		12.4%
1980	976		13.6%
1990	895		−8.3%
2000	884		−1.2%
2010	745		−15.7%
2020	760		2.0%
U.S. Decennial Census

As of the census of 2000, there were 884 people, 395 households, and 259 families residing in the village. The population density was 503.3 inhabitants per square mile (194.3/km^{2}). There were 727 housing units at an average density of 413.9 per square mile (159.8/km^{2}). The racial makeup of the village was 98.19% White, 0.11% African American, 0.68% Native American, 0.11% Asian, 0.34% from other races, and 0.57% from two or more races. Hispanic or Latino of any race were 0.57% of the population.

There were 395 households, out of which 21.3% had children under the age of 18 living with them, 53.7% were married couples living together, 8.6% had a female householder with no husband present, and 34.2% were non-families. 27.6% of all households were made up of individuals, and 14.9% had someone living alone who was 65 years of age or older. The average household size was 2.23 and the average family size was 2.67.

In the village, the population was spread out, with 20.2% under the age of 18, 4.6% from 18 to 24, 23.9% from 25 to 44, 29.6% from 45 to 64, and 21.6% who were 65 years of age or older. The median age was 46 years. For every 100 females, there were 98.7 males. For every 100 females age 18 and over, there were 95.3 males.

The median income for a household in the village was $36,382, and the median income for a family was $39,091. Males had a median income of $37,917 versus $26,250 for females. The per capita income for the village was $18,287. About 4.3% of families and 8.4% of the population were below the poverty line, including 9.6% of those under age 18 and 12.0% of those age 65 or over.
