= Fair Haven Beach State Park =

State park in Cayuga County, New York

- Location within New York
- Type: State park
- Location: 14985 State Park Road; Fair Haven, New York
- Coordinates: 43°20′47″N 76°41′18″W
- Area: 1,141 acres (4.62 km^{2})
- Operator: New York State Office of Parks, Recreation and Historic Preservation
- Visitors: 295,527 (in 2014)
- Open: All year
- Website: Fair Haven Beach State Park

Fair Haven Beach State Park is a 1,141-acre (4.62 km^{2}) state park on the southeastern shore of Lake Ontario in upstate New York. It is located on the east side of Little Sodus Bay in the town of Sterling in Cayuga County, northeast of the village of Fair Haven. The southern part of the park is sometimes called Fair Haven State Park.

The park covers shoreline bluffs, sandy beaches and adjoining hilly woodlands. Inland, the park includes Sterling Pond and Sterling Creek.

== Park facilities ==
The park offers 1,500 feet (460 m) of sand beach including 600 feet (180 m) of guarded swim area on Lake Ontario, in addition to five picnic areas with picnic tables and pavilions, a playground and ball field, a campground with tent and trailer sites, a boat launch and marina, and an 18-hole golf course. Amenities include a camp store, a concession stand, and boat rentals with paddle boards, canoes, and kayaks available for use only on the Sterling Pond waterway. Activities at the park include recreation programs, hiking, waterfowl hunting in season, fishing and ice-fishing, sledding, cross-country skiing, and snowmobiling. Fishing and boating opportunities are available in Lake Ontario and the adjoining Little Sodus Bay.

Three campgrounds, four cottages, and a cabin colony each contain a centralized restroom with showers. The cabin colony contains 30 units, including six full-service cabins and nine winterized cabins. A total of 46 electric and 138 non-electric camp sites are available. The cottages are located outside the grounds of the park and were donated by Fair Haven locals.

== History ==
The camp was originally built by the Civilian Conservation Corps in the early 1930s and later by German POWs during its days as the Prison Camp at Fair Haven.

== See also ==
- List of New York state parks
