= Sterling, New York =

- Town
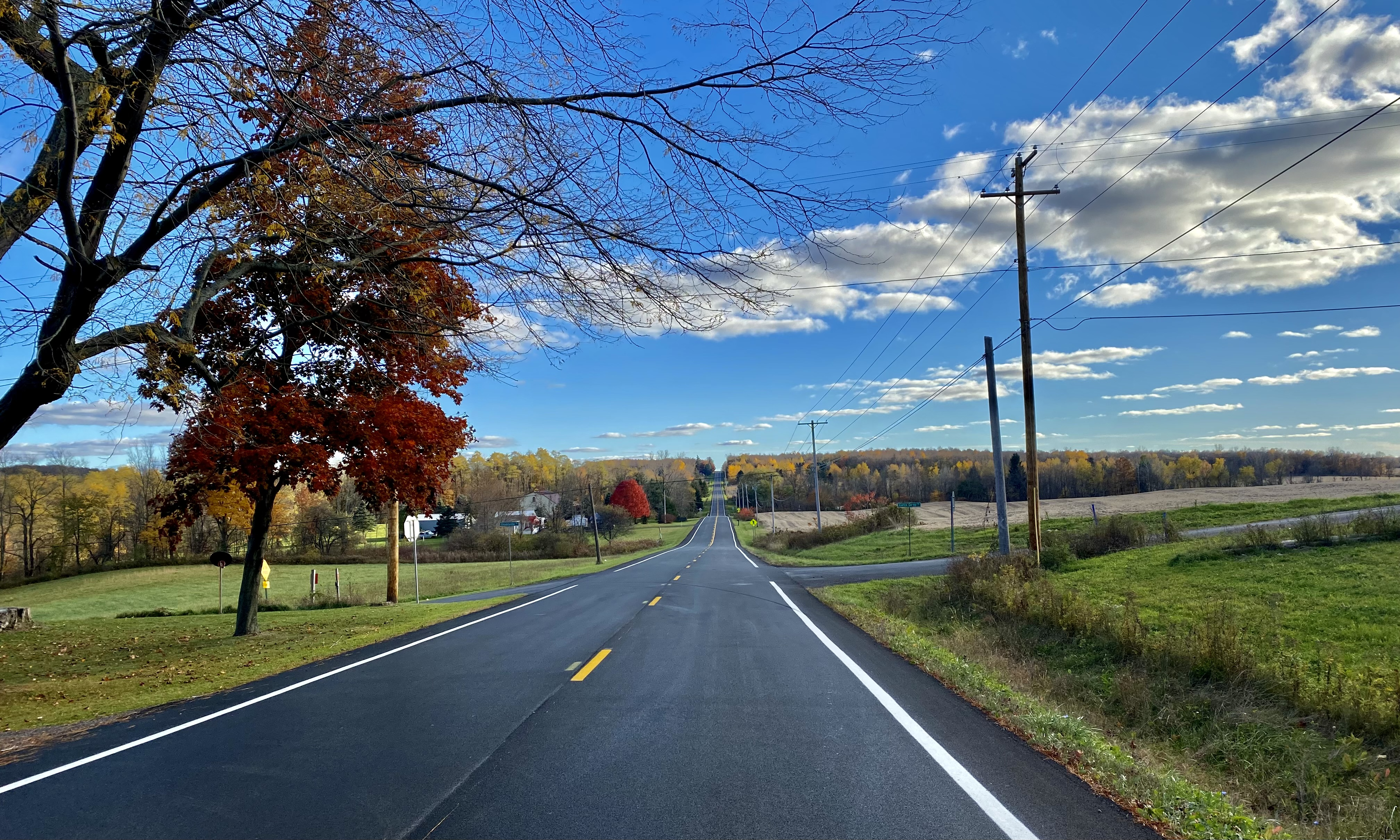
- Heading south along State Route 38 in Sterling

- Location in Cayuga County and New York
- Coordinates: 43°19′N 76°40′W
- Country: United States
- State: New York
- County: Cayuga

Government
  - Type: Town Council
  - Town Council: Members' List: •; •; •; •

Area
  - Total: 47.11 sq mi (122.02 km^{2})
  - Land: 45.44 sq mi (117.69 km^{2})
  - Water: 1.67 sq mi (4.33 km^{2})
- Elevation: 344 ft (105 m)

Population (2010)
  - Total: 3,040
  - Estimate (2016): 3,006
  - Density: 66.1/sq mi (25.54/km^{2})
- Time zone: UTC-5 (Eastern (EST))
  - Summer (DST): UTC-4 (EDT)
- ZIP Codes: 13156 (Sterling); 13064 (Fair Haven); 13111 (Martville); 13143 (Red Creek); 13126 (Oswego)
- Area code: 315
- FIPS code: 36-011-71146
- GNIS feature ID: 0979524
- Website: www.cayugacounty.us/sterling

Sterling is a town in Cayuga County, New York, United States. The population was 3,040 at the 2010 census. Located on the shore of Lake Ontario, the town is named after William Alexander, Lord Stirling, an American general of the Revolutionary War.

== History ==
The region was formerly part of the territory of the Onondaga, one of the original Five Nations of the Iroquois Confederacy. However, as allies of the British, who were defeated, they were forced to cede most of their lands in New York to the state after the Revolutionary War. This land was made part of the Central New York Military Tract, which was divided and granted as pay to veteran soldiers of the Revolution.

The first European-American settler, Pierre Dumas (also recorded as Peter DeMass), arrived in 1805. The Town of Sterling was formed in 1812 from the Town of Cato.

Improvements made to Little Sodus Bay of Lake Ontario in the early 19th century enabled the town to have port facilities and take part in the Great Lakes trade. Since commercial use of the port declined in the late 19th century with changes in transportation and development of western cities, the town has developed as a destination for vacations and recreation. The Sterling Renaissance Festival, held annually during the summer for over forty years, also attracts tourists to the town.

The Sterling District No. 5 Schoolhouse and Sterling Grist Mill Complex were listed on the National Register of Historic Places in 1985.

== Geography ==
According to the United States Census Bureau, the town has a total area of 47.1 square miles (122.0 km^{2}), of which 45.4 square miles (117.7 km^{2}) is land and 1.7 square miles (4.3 km^{2}), or 3.53%, is water.

The north boundary of Sterling is Lake Ontario, one of the Great Lakes. Sterling is the only town in Cayuga County with access to the Great Lakes.

The western terminus of New York State Route 3 and northern terminus of New York State Route 38 are in the town. New York State Route 104 passes across the southern part of Sterling, and New York State Route 104A passes across the north.

== Demographics ==
Historical population
Census	Pop.	Note	%±
1820	792		—
1830	1,436		81.3%
1840	2,533		76.4%
1850	2,808		10.9%
1860	3,008		7.1%
1870	2,840		−5.6%
1880	3,034		6.8%
1890	2,959		−2.5%
1900	2,516		−15.0%
1910	2,359		−6.2%
1920	2,039		−13.6%
1930	1,966		−3.6%
1940	1,943		−1.2%
1950	2,050		5.5%
1960	2,495		21.7%
1970	2,589		3.8%
1980	3,301		27.5%
1990	3,285		−0.5%
2000	3,432		4.5%
2010	3,040		−11.4%
2016 (est.)	3,006		−1.1%
U.S. Decennial Census

As of the census of 2000, there were 3,432 people, 1,337 households, and 962 families residing in the town. The population density was 75.2 inhabitants per square mile (29.0/km^{2}). There were 1,922 housing units at an average density of 42.1 per square mile (16.3/km^{2}). The racial makeup of the town was 98.46% White, 0.09% African American, 0.44% Native American, 0.06% Asian, 0.23% from other races, and 0.73% from two or more races. Hispanic or Latino of any race were 0.50% of the population.

There were 1,337 households, out of which 31.6% had children under the age of 18 living with them, 58.0% were married couples living together, 8.6% had a female householder with no husband present, and 28.0% were non-families. 22.1% of all households were made up of individuals, and 9.2% had someone living alone who was 65 years of age or older. The average household size was 2.56 and the average family size was 2.99.

In the town, the population was spread out, with 26.5% under the age of 18, 6.1% from 18 to 24, 27.9% from 25 to 44, 26.0% from 45 to 64, and 13.6% who were 65 years of age or older. The median age was 38 years. For every 100 females, there were 104.8 males. For every 100 females age 18 and over, there were 103.5 males.

The median income for a household in the town was $35,061, and the median income for a family was $38,125. Males had a median income of $34,205 versus $24,917 for females. The per capita income for the town was $15,912. About 7.4% of families and 11.7% of the population were below the poverty line, including 14.6% of those under age 18 and 14.2% of those age 65 or over.

== Communities and locations in Sterling ==
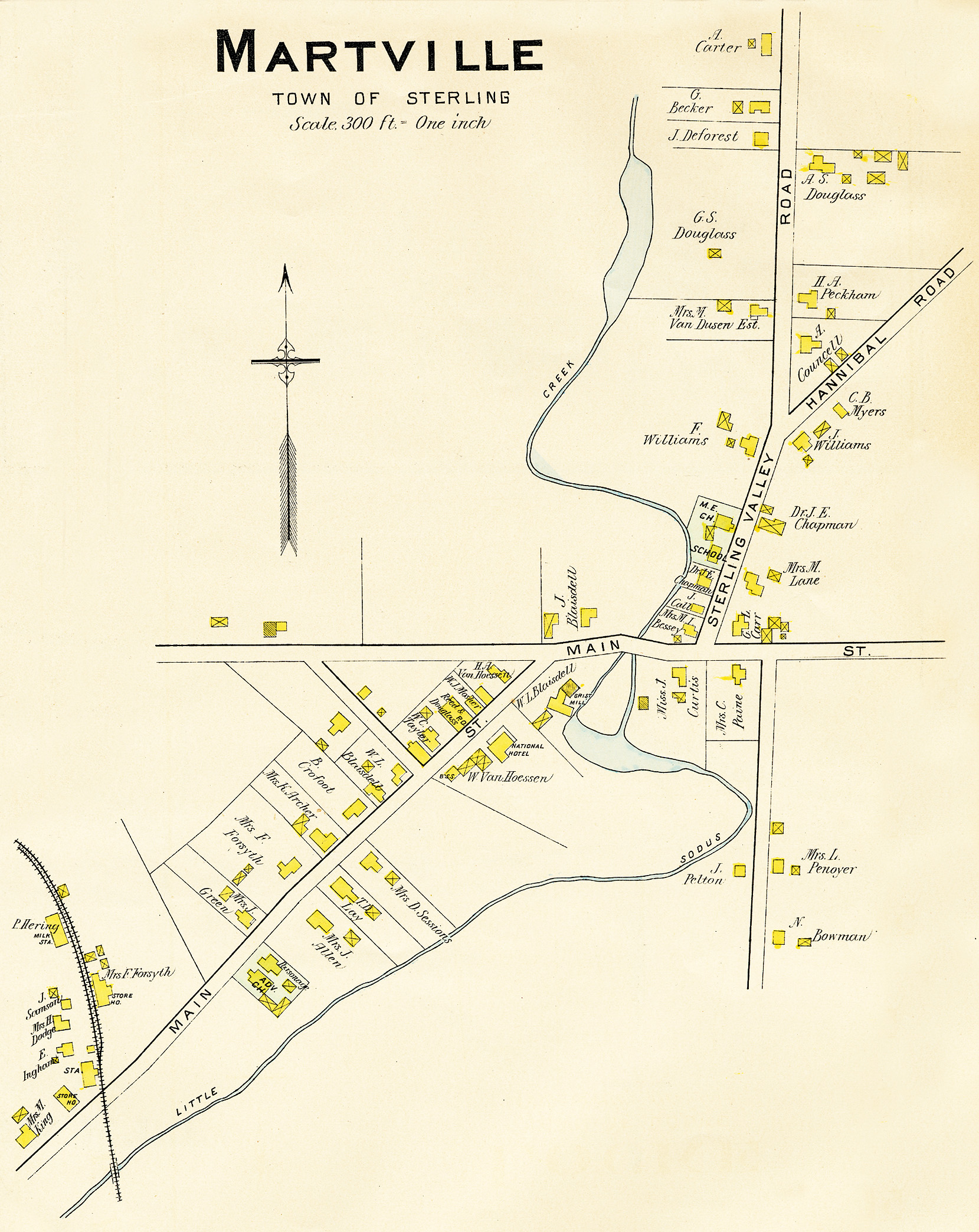
Map of Martville, N.Y. (1904)

- Crocketts (formerly "Sterling Valley Station") – A hamlet near the eastern town line, at the intersection of Route 104A and Route 3.
- Fair Haven – A village in the northern part of the town.
- Fair Haven Beach State Park – A state park north of Fair Haven.
- Fintches Corners – A hamlet centrally located in the town, on NY Route 38.
- Little Sodus Bay – A bay of Lake Ontario north of Fair Haven. The bay is so named to distinguish it from Sodus Bay to the west.
- Martville – A location near the eastern town line on NY State Route 104.
- McKnight Corners – A location northeast of North Fair Haven.
- Moon Beach – A lakeside hamlet on Lake Ontario in the northeastern section of the town.
- Nine Mile Creek – A stream entering Lake Ontario in the northeastern part of the town.
- North Fair Haven – A location in the northeastern part of the village of Fair Haven on the east side of Little Sodus Bay.
- North Sterling – A hamlet northeast of Fair Haven on NY-104A.
- North Victory – A hamlet near the southern town line at the intersection of Route 104 and Route 38.
- The Pond – A small lake separated from Lake Ontario by a narrow ridge, located in Fair Haven State Park.
- Sterling – A hamlet east of Fair Haven and on NY-38. Also known as "Sterling Center".
- Sterling Creek – A stream flowing into The Pond.
- Sterling Valley – A hamlet northeast of Fair Haven village, located on Route NY-104A north of its intersection with Route 3.
- West Nine Mile Point – A projection into Lake Ontario, northeast of Fair Haven.
- Whiting Corners – A location in the southwestern part of the town.
