= Sterling Renaissance Festival =

Annual Renaissance festival in Sterling, New York, U.S.

Coordinates: 43.360485°N 76.655271°W

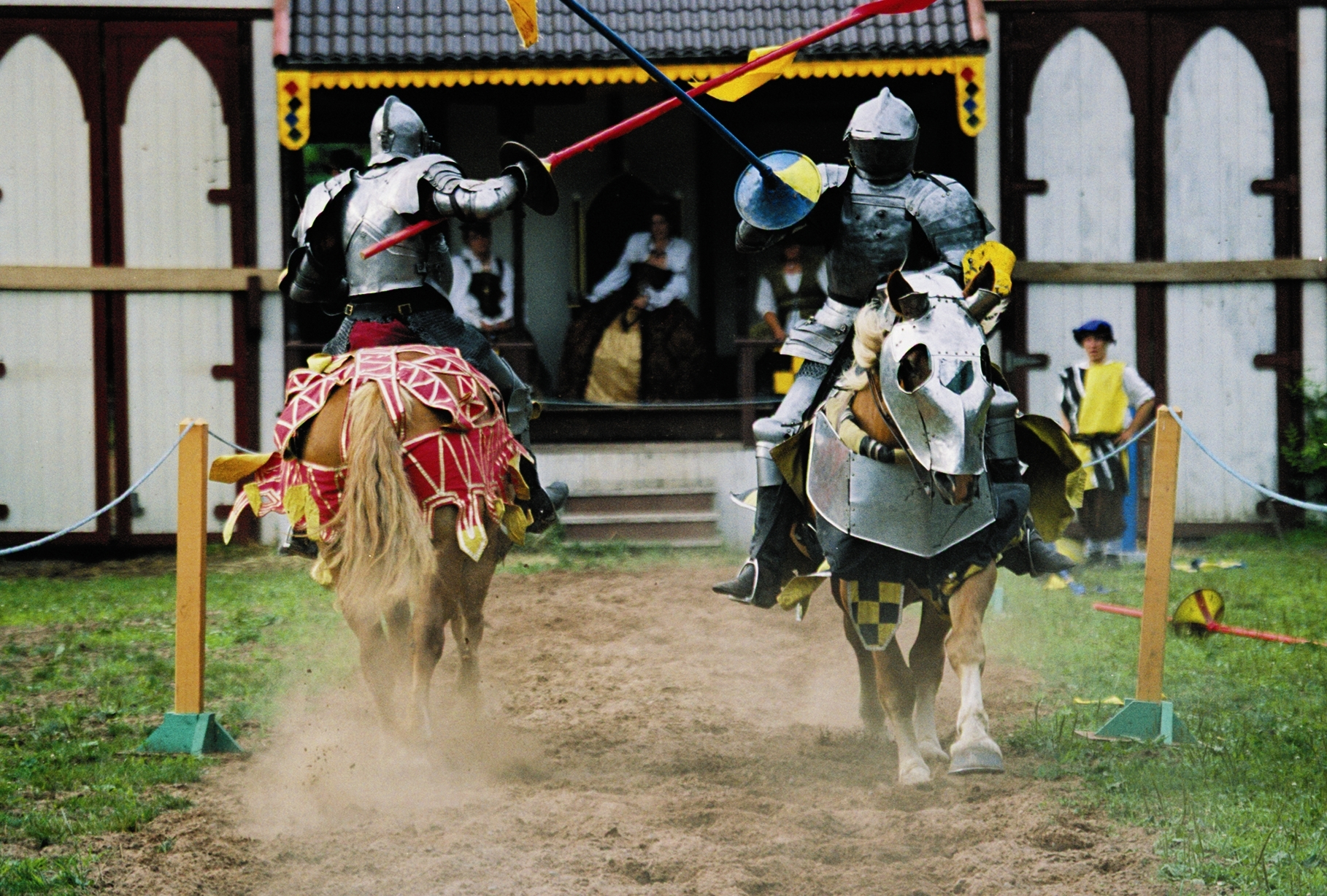
- Two knights on armored chargers attempt to unseat one another in this jousting exposition at the Sterling Renaissance Festival.
- Genre: Renaissance fair
- Dates: July - August
- Locations: Sterling, New York
- Inaugurated: 1976
- Attendance: 100,000 (average)
- Stages: 9
- Website: www.sterlingfestival.com

Sterling Renaissance Festival is a Renaissance Festival that operates in Sterling, New York. Since 1976, it runs for seven consecutive weekends through July and August and features music, comedy, and interactive theatre performances as well as the work of artisans and craftspeople.

The COVID-19 pandemic caused the 45th festival to be cancelled in 2020; it was deferred to 2021.

== Setting ==
The setting is the year 1585 in the fictional village of Warwick, which rambles across a wooded hillside and includes many permanent structures (some two-story) on the occasion of their annual festival. Queen Elizabeth is in attendance in the company of the members of her court, including various real-life historical figures, such as Sir Walter Raleigh and Sir Francis Drake. These ladies and gentlemen of the court perform shows, such as the human chess match and Tea with the Queen, in addition to interacting with patrons. The entirety of village life is represented by the cast, known as the Wyldewood Players (formerly, the Bless-the-Mark Players). The cast of costumed actors portray all kinds of villagers; gypsies, pirates, washer-wenches and others. They stroll the grounds, improvising scenarios to entertain the patrons.

Costumed entertainers include Renaissance musicians, bagpipers, illusionists, jugglers, sword-swallowers, fortune-tellers, and comedy acts. Twice daily the performers join together in a parade through the Festival grounds, and the Festival closes each evening with a pub sing in which everyone is encouraged to sing along.

At the base of the west-facing hillside is the jousting field. Here, full-contact jousting takes place, as well as displays of archery and (on Highland weekend) Highland games. In addition, patrons can ride the war-horses of the jousters for a small fee.

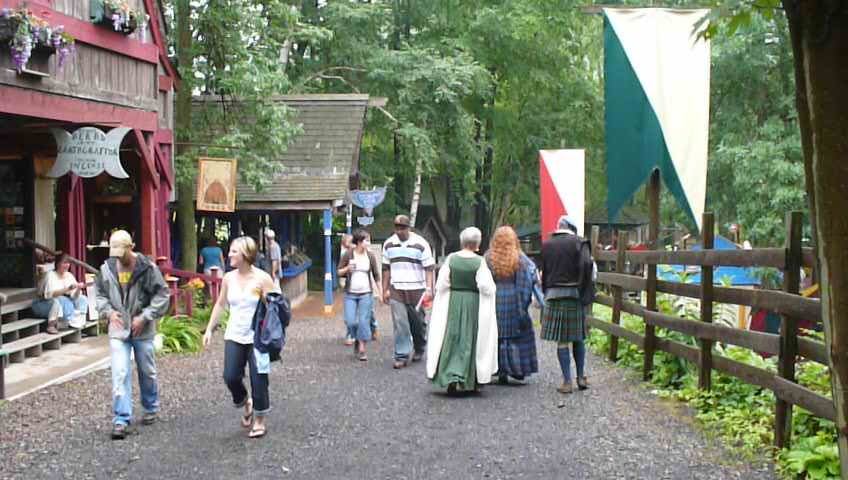

== Attractions ==
=== Stage shows ===
Sterling has a paid cast known as the Wyldewood Players, as well as musicians, acrobats, acting troupes, sword-swallowers, comedy acts, roving players who interact with patrons, and many more (see "Performers" below for a partial listing).

=== Arts and crafts ===
Like most Faires, the Sterling Renaissance Festival has a large number of artisans and craftspeople, such as glass-blowers, blacksmiths, bookbinders, and potters. Other vendors and wares include leather and costuming shops, weapons, custom footwear, walking sticks, musical instruments, jewelry, toys, and woodworking.

=== Games ===
There are also a number of games of skill available for an additional fee, such as archery, axe-throwing, "Tomato Justice" (where participants pelt a man with ripe tomatoes), the Ladder of Truth, and the Pillow Fyte. Several human-powered rides are available.

=== Food ===
Various foods are available, including such Faire staples as turkey legs and shish-kabobs, but also including vegetarian items like portobello mushroom sandwiches and fresh fruit. The Rose & Crown Tavern (renamed in 2010 from the "Bad Dog Tavern") serves alcohol, including mead, and has a selection of meat pies, bacon-wrapped scallops, and other foods. In the past, the Tavern has featured live entertainment.

=== Themed weekends ===
Each weekend has a formal theme that will often inform the storyline acted out by the townsfolk. Current and past themes include Family Appreciation Weekend (discount tickets for families). Marketplace Weekend (purchases from vendors earn free tickets), Ale Fest Weekend, Highland Fling (Scottish music and competitions), Pirate Invasion, Romance Weekend, and Fantasy Weekend.

=== "Lost Warwick" ===
In the summer of 2020 the COVID-19 pandemic forced the cancellation of the regular season. In response, creative director Gary Izzo teamed up with members of the regular cast and independent performers to write, produce, and film an original six-episode story entitled "The Legend of Lost Warwick". The story follows the leading citizens of Sterling (the Lord and Lady Mayor, the Sheriff, and others) trying to plan for a pending visit from the Queen of England, when they realize that the entire village has mysteriously vanished. New installments aired weekly on Saturday afternoons during what would have been the festival's usual run (July 11 through Aug. 15), with previous episodes becoming available for on-demand streaming. There was also a live "Tavern Talk" episode on the preceding (Friday) evening. Each Saturday episode not only furthered the story, but also showcased artisans, musicians, and stage shows, and was interspersed with live discussion from the Warwick Inn featuring a different special guest. The show was filmed on the Festival grounds, and all profits went to Renaissance Entertainers Services and Crafters United (RESCU).

== Performers ==
The Wyldewood Players, the oldest full-time professional acting troupe of any Renaissance Festival, comprise The Queen, her court, and the Warwick villagers (barber-surgeon, washer wenches, mud beggars, gravedigger, etc.). Entertainments include The Queen's Tea, Her Majesty's Daily Diversion, Trial & Dunke, and a daily Publick Execution. The Players' creative director Gary Izzo has more than 30 years' experience with interactive theatre, including with Disney theme parks, and is the author of The Art of Play: The New Genre of Interactive Theatre (Heinemann Drama, 1997) and Acting Interactive Theatre: A Handbook (Pearson Education, 1998).

Other regular acts at the Fair include the following:

Music and dance

- Bells & Motley
- Borerraig Irregulars
- Cantiga
- Concinnity (former)
- Crannog
- Empty Hats
- Jim Hancock & Friends
- Looney Lucy
- Merry Mischief
- Randal Piper
- Sirena
- Vodca Family
- Wolgemut

Comedy and theatre

- Arthur Greenleaf Holmes
- The Bastard Monks
- Churchyard O'Shea's Filthy Irish Stories
- The Da Vinci Brothers
- Emrys Fleet, Ratcatcher
- Giacomo the Jester
- Hey Nunnie! Nunnie! (former)
- Lenny Burrows, Master of Revels
- Theatre of Fools / Wacky Chicken Show
- Zilch the Tory Steller

Acrobatic and athletic

- Cirqa Brava
- Clan Tynker Circus
- Daniel, Duke of Danger
- Don Juan and Miguel (former)
- Flight of Fantasy
- Jacques Ze Whipper (former)
- Johnny Fox (former)
- Judas and Magnolia
- New Riders of the Golden Age (Warhorse Productions)
- Topsy Turvy
- Whipperwil Archery

== Patron participation ==
Many Fair attendees come in costume ("garb"), and booths inside the grounds offer garb for sale or rent. Renaissance, fantasy, pirate, and steampunk are favorite themes. In 2008, for the first time, peace-tied period weapons were permitted.

Sterling has an active group of long-time season ticket-holders known as "Family of Faire", many of whom have developed their own characters and attend every weekend of the season.

== Ownership ==
The Sterling Renaissance Festival was founded in 1976 by Dennis Ouellette Sr. The Festival was subsequently owned and operated by Gerald and Virginia Young for more than thirty years.

The Festival is currently operated by Empire Attractions LLC and continues to host its annual Renaissance-themed event in Sterling, New York, featuring live entertainment, theatrical performances, artisan demonstrations, and family-friendly attractions.

== In popular culture ==
Jamie Denbo, creator of Lifetime's American Princess, is a former Sterling cast member.

== See also ==
- List of Renaissance fairs
- Historical reenactment
- Society for Creative Anachronism
- List of open air and living history museums in the United States
