= Southern Central Railroad =

Overview
- Locale: New York
- Dates of operation: 1865–1895
- Successor: Lehigh Valley Railroad

Technical
- Track gauge: 4 ft 8 1/2 in (1,435 mm)
- Length: 116.8 miles (188.0 km)

The Southern Central Railroad is a defunct railroad which operated in the state of New York in the nineteenth century. The company's line ran from Fair Haven, New York, on the south shore of Lake Ontario, to Athens, Pennsylvania, in the Southern Tier and just over the border into Pennsylvania. The company was incorporated in 1865 and became part of the Lehigh Valley Railroad system in 1895. Most of its line was abandoned by the Lehigh Valley Railroad between 1937–1979; the portion between Harford Mills, New York, and Owego, New York, is owned by the Tioga County Industrial Development Agency and operated by the Owego and Harford Railway.

== History ==
The Lake Ontario, Auburn and New York Railroad, chartered in 1852, had graded a line between Fair Haven and Auburn, New York, but ran out of money without ever laying track. The new Southern Central Railroad was chartered on September 6, 1865, to complete this work and build a line from Fair Haven due south to Owego, New York, where it could interchange traffic with the Erie Railroad. The railroad opened between Owego and Auburn on March 8, 1870.

The Erie was at that time still a broad-gauge railroad, which made interchange with the standard gauge Southern Central difficult. With financial assistance from the Lehigh Valley Railroad, the Southern Central built south from Owego toward the state line at Athens, Pennsylvania (later Sayre), and an interchange with the Pennsylvania and New York Railroad, a Lehigh Valley Railroad company. This extension opened on January 3, 1871. The northern part of the line to Fair Haven finally opened on December 1, 1871.

Financial problems led to the Lehigh Valley leasing the company in 1887. The debts were such that, in 1895, the Lehigh Valley formed a subsidiary, the Lehigh and New York Railroad, to buy the Southern Central in a foreclosure sale, after which the Lehigh Valley leased the Lehigh and New York. The latter company was merged into the Lehigh Valley at the end of 1949. Under the Lehigh Valley, the line was known first as the Lehigh and New York Branch; then later as the Auburn Branch.

== Route ==
=== Auburn Branch ===
The line from North Fair Haven to Sayre measured 115 miles (185 km). It interchanged with several other railroads, including the New York Central Railroad, New York, Ontario and Western Railway, Erie Railroad and Delaware, Lackawanna and Western Railroad. The Lehigh Valley abandoned the coal dock at North Fair Haven and cut-back the northern end of the line to Fair Haven in 1937. After World War II, the Lehigh Valley gradually-abandoned the branch. In 1952–1953, it further cut-back the branch from Fair Haven to Cato, New York. The construction of the New York State Thruway, in 1954, eliminated the interchange with the New York Central at Weedsport, New York, leading to a further abandonment between Cato and Auburn, New York in 1957. In 1968, the Lehigh Valley Railroad, now under Pennsylvania Railroad control, abandoned the branch between Auburn and Moravia, New York.

In the last years of Lehigh Valley operation, the line north of Owego was split into two secondary tracks:

- the Mead Secondary, from the end of the line just north of Moravia to Freeville, New York, where it interchanged with the Lehigh Valley's Elmira and Cortland Branch
- the Freeville Secondary, from Freeville south to Owego

The remaining Auburn Branch between Sayre and Owego was not included in Conrail, given the parallel Erie Lackawanna Railway main line, and was abandoned after April 1, 1976.

=== Owego-Harford ===
Although the New York Department of Transportation spent $832,000 to rehabilitate the line north of Owego, neither of the two secondary tracks was included in Conrail. Additional subsidies from the State of New York led to Conrail operation of the entire Sayre–Mead line, although the line was abandoned north of Locke, New York after August 31, 1976. Ownership remained with the bankrupt Lehigh Valley Railroad. In April, 1978, the Lehigh Valley further abandoned the portion between Locke and Dryden, New York. A final abandonment in 1979 removed the line between Dryden and Harford Mills, New York.

On January 1, 1980, the Delaware and Hudson Railroad replaced Conrail as the operator of the line north of Owego. In 1981, the Tioga County Industrial Development Agency (IDA) acquired the line from the trustees of the Lehigh Valley Railroad; then leased it back to the D&H. The D&H terminated the lease in 1985, after closure of the Arco Petroleum Products storage facility in Harford Mills. The Tioga Central Railroad operated both freight and excursion service on the line from 1986–1992, when the IDA replaced them with the Owego and Harford Railway. The O&H continues to operate the line today.
