= Cottage Farm (Fair Haven, New York) =

Historic house in New York, United States

- U.S. National Register of Historic Places
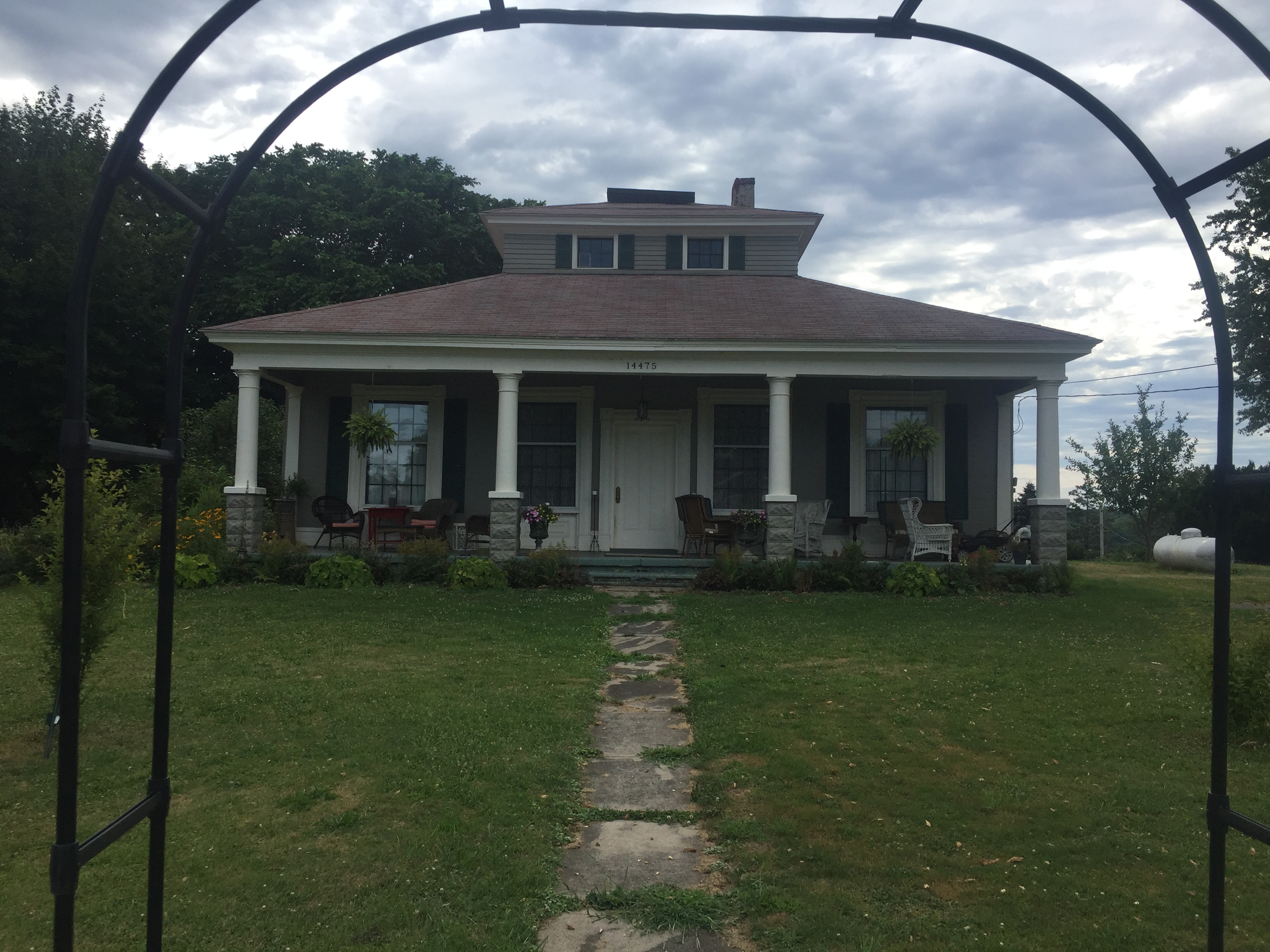
- House in 2022

- Location within New York Location within the United States
- Location: 14475 Richmond Ave., Fair Haven, New York
- Coordinates: 43°19′03″N 76°42′16″W
- Area: Less than 1 acre (0.40 ha)
- Built: c.1835, c.1874, 1884, 1910
- Architectural style: Greek Revival, Folk Victorian
- NRHP reference No.: 12000952
- Added to NRHP: November 21, 2012

Cottage Farm is a historic home located at Fair Haven in Cayuga County, New York. It was originally built in the late-1830s in the Greek Revival style, and extensively remodeled about 1874 and again in 1910. It is a one-story, frame dwelling, with a central projecting section and low hipped roof. It features full-width columned verandahs on two sides with Folk Victorian style design elements. As of 2012, the house was used as a seasonal residence.

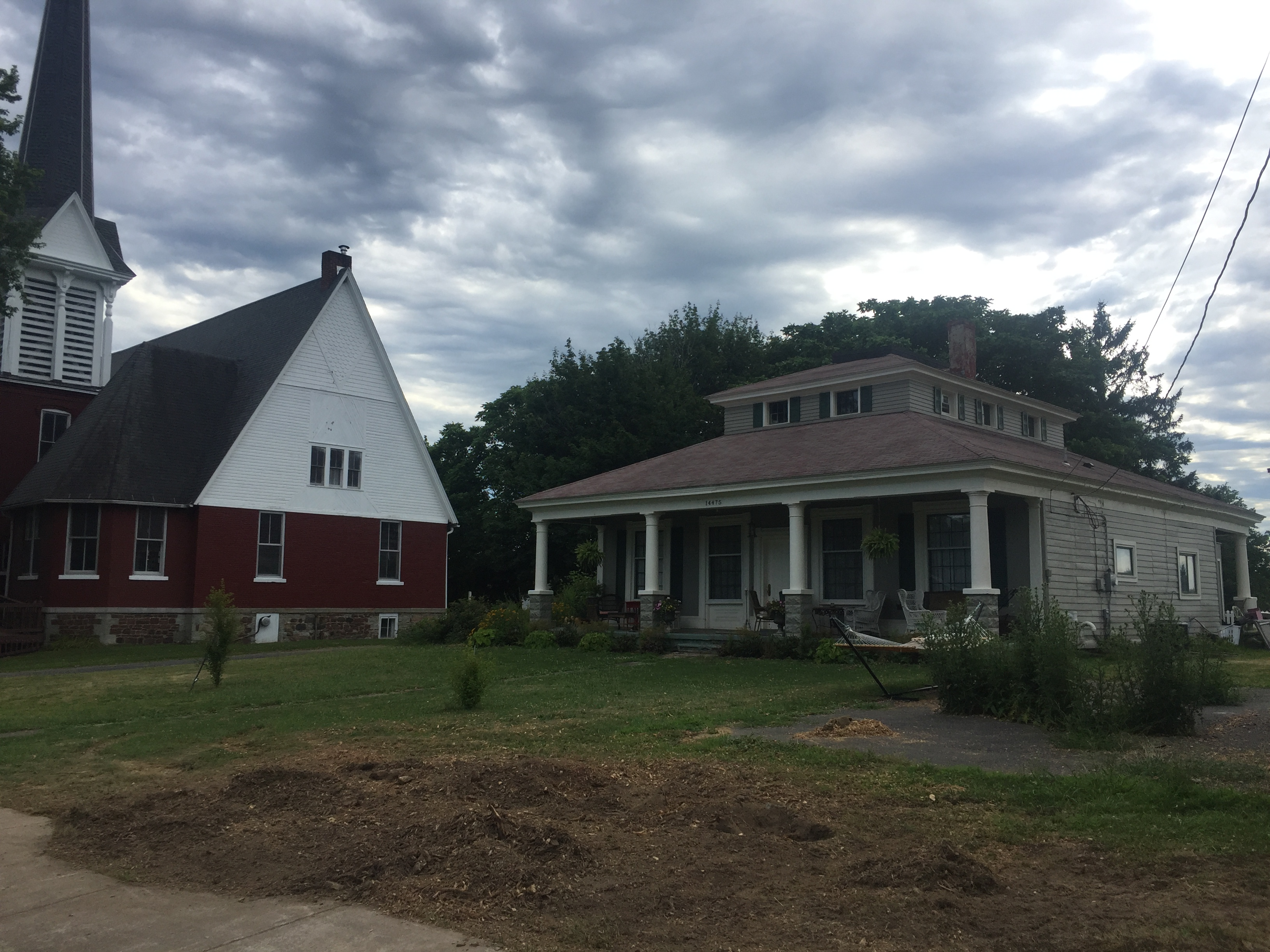
Cottage is adjacent to Fair Haven Community Church.

It was listed on the National Register of Historic Places in 2012.
